

195001–195100 

|-bgcolor=#fefefe
| 195001 ||  || — || January 20, 2002 || Anderson Mesa || LONEOS || — || align=right | 1.3 km || 
|-id=002 bgcolor=#fefefe
| 195002 ||  || — || January 19, 2002 || Anderson Mesa || LONEOS || — || align=right | 1.4 km || 
|-id=003 bgcolor=#fefefe
| 195003 ||  || — || January 20, 2002 || Anderson Mesa || LONEOS || — || align=right | 2.0 km || 
|-id=004 bgcolor=#fefefe
| 195004 ||  || — || February 3, 2002 || Palomar || NEAT || — || align=right | 2.4 km || 
|-id=005 bgcolor=#E9E9E9
| 195005 ||  || — || February 3, 2002 || Palomar || NEAT || — || align=right | 1.7 km || 
|-id=006 bgcolor=#E9E9E9
| 195006 ||  || — || February 4, 2002 || Haleakala || NEAT || — || align=right | 1.7 km || 
|-id=007 bgcolor=#fefefe
| 195007 ||  || — || February 6, 2002 || Desert Eagle || W. K. Y. Yeung || MAS || align=right | 1.2 km || 
|-id=008 bgcolor=#E9E9E9
| 195008 ||  || — || February 5, 2002 || Črni Vrh || Črni Vrh || — || align=right | 3.1 km || 
|-id=009 bgcolor=#FA8072
| 195009 ||  || — || February 8, 2002 || Fountain Hills || C. W. Juels, P. R. Holvorcem || — || align=right | 2.0 km || 
|-id=010 bgcolor=#E9E9E9
| 195010 ||  || — || February 9, 2002 || Desert Eagle || W. K. Y. Yeung || — || align=right | 2.6 km || 
|-id=011 bgcolor=#E9E9E9
| 195011 ||  || — || February 10, 2002 || Desert Eagle || W. K. Y. Yeung || — || align=right | 1.8 km || 
|-id=012 bgcolor=#fefefe
| 195012 ||  || — || February 6, 2002 || Socorro || LINEAR || V || align=right | 1.0 km || 
|-id=013 bgcolor=#fefefe
| 195013 ||  || — || February 6, 2002 || Socorro || LINEAR || NYS || align=right | 1.2 km || 
|-id=014 bgcolor=#fefefe
| 195014 ||  || — || February 6, 2002 || Socorro || LINEAR || — || align=right | 1.5 km || 
|-id=015 bgcolor=#fefefe
| 195015 ||  || — || February 5, 2002 || Palomar || NEAT || — || align=right | 1.3 km || 
|-id=016 bgcolor=#fefefe
| 195016 ||  || — || February 5, 2002 || Palomar || NEAT || MAS || align=right | 1.1 km || 
|-id=017 bgcolor=#E9E9E9
| 195017 ||  || — || February 5, 2002 || Palomar || NEAT || — || align=right | 1.5 km || 
|-id=018 bgcolor=#fefefe
| 195018 ||  || — || February 6, 2002 || Palomar || NEAT || — || align=right data-sort-value="0.96" | 960 m || 
|-id=019 bgcolor=#fefefe
| 195019 ||  || — || February 6, 2002 || Socorro || LINEAR || KLI || align=right | 2.4 km || 
|-id=020 bgcolor=#fefefe
| 195020 ||  || — || February 6, 2002 || Socorro || LINEAR || NYS || align=right data-sort-value="0.94" | 940 m || 
|-id=021 bgcolor=#fefefe
| 195021 ||  || — || February 6, 2002 || Socorro || LINEAR || — || align=right | 1.3 km || 
|-id=022 bgcolor=#E9E9E9
| 195022 ||  || — || February 6, 2002 || Socorro || LINEAR || GER || align=right | 2.8 km || 
|-id=023 bgcolor=#E9E9E9
| 195023 ||  || — || February 6, 2002 || Socorro || LINEAR || — || align=right | 2.5 km || 
|-id=024 bgcolor=#E9E9E9
| 195024 ||  || — || February 6, 2002 || Socorro || LINEAR || — || align=right | 1.9 km || 
|-id=025 bgcolor=#fefefe
| 195025 ||  || — || February 6, 2002 || Socorro || LINEAR || — || align=right | 1.3 km || 
|-id=026 bgcolor=#fefefe
| 195026 ||  || — || February 7, 2002 || Socorro || LINEAR || NYS || align=right | 1.2 km || 
|-id=027 bgcolor=#fefefe
| 195027 ||  || — || February 11, 2002 || Desert Eagle || W. K. Y. Yeung || — || align=right | 1.3 km || 
|-id=028 bgcolor=#E9E9E9
| 195028 ||  || — || February 5, 2002 || Haleakala || NEAT || — || align=right | 2.5 km || 
|-id=029 bgcolor=#fefefe
| 195029 ||  || — || February 7, 2002 || Palomar || NEAT || — || align=right | 1.1 km || 
|-id=030 bgcolor=#fefefe
| 195030 ||  || — || February 6, 2002 || Kitt Peak || Spacewatch || MAS || align=right data-sort-value="0.96" | 960 m || 
|-id=031 bgcolor=#E9E9E9
| 195031 ||  || — || February 8, 2002 || Palomar || NEAT || JUN || align=right | 1.7 km || 
|-id=032 bgcolor=#fefefe
| 195032 ||  || — || February 12, 2002 || Desert Eagle || W. K. Y. Yeung || MAS || align=right | 1.1 km || 
|-id=033 bgcolor=#fefefe
| 195033 ||  || — || February 12, 2002 || Desert Eagle || W. K. Y. Yeung || — || align=right | 1.5 km || 
|-id=034 bgcolor=#E9E9E9
| 195034 ||  || — || February 7, 2002 || Socorro || LINEAR || — || align=right | 1.6 km || 
|-id=035 bgcolor=#E9E9E9
| 195035 ||  || — || February 7, 2002 || Socorro || LINEAR || — || align=right | 2.0 km || 
|-id=036 bgcolor=#fefefe
| 195036 ||  || — || February 7, 2002 || Socorro || LINEAR || — || align=right | 1.4 km || 
|-id=037 bgcolor=#fefefe
| 195037 ||  || — || February 7, 2002 || Socorro || LINEAR || NYS || align=right | 1.4 km || 
|-id=038 bgcolor=#E9E9E9
| 195038 ||  || — || February 7, 2002 || Socorro || LINEAR || — || align=right | 1.4 km || 
|-id=039 bgcolor=#fefefe
| 195039 ||  || — || February 7, 2002 || Kitt Peak || Spacewatch || NYS || align=right data-sort-value="0.92" | 920 m || 
|-id=040 bgcolor=#fefefe
| 195040 ||  || — || February 12, 2002 || Desert Eagle || W. K. Y. Yeung || MAS || align=right data-sort-value="0.88" | 880 m || 
|-id=041 bgcolor=#C2FFFF
| 195041 ||  || — || February 10, 2002 || Socorro || LINEAR || L4 || align=right | 12 km || 
|-id=042 bgcolor=#fefefe
| 195042 ||  || — || February 6, 2002 || Socorro || LINEAR || NYS || align=right data-sort-value="0.84" | 840 m || 
|-id=043 bgcolor=#E9E9E9
| 195043 ||  || — || February 6, 2002 || Socorro || LINEAR || — || align=right | 1.8 km || 
|-id=044 bgcolor=#E9E9E9
| 195044 ||  || — || February 6, 2002 || Socorro || LINEAR || — || align=right | 1.8 km || 
|-id=045 bgcolor=#fefefe
| 195045 ||  || — || February 7, 2002 || Socorro || LINEAR || NYS || align=right data-sort-value="0.79" | 790 m || 
|-id=046 bgcolor=#fefefe
| 195046 ||  || — || February 7, 2002 || Socorro || LINEAR || MAS || align=right | 1.1 km || 
|-id=047 bgcolor=#fefefe
| 195047 ||  || — || February 7, 2002 || Socorro || LINEAR || MAS || align=right data-sort-value="0.95" | 950 m || 
|-id=048 bgcolor=#fefefe
| 195048 ||  || — || February 7, 2002 || Socorro || LINEAR || — || align=right | 1.3 km || 
|-id=049 bgcolor=#fefefe
| 195049 ||  || — || February 7, 2002 || Socorro || LINEAR || MAS || align=right | 1.1 km || 
|-id=050 bgcolor=#fefefe
| 195050 ||  || — || February 7, 2002 || Socorro || LINEAR || — || align=right data-sort-value="0.86" | 860 m || 
|-id=051 bgcolor=#fefefe
| 195051 ||  || — || February 7, 2002 || Socorro || LINEAR || — || align=right | 2.6 km || 
|-id=052 bgcolor=#E9E9E9
| 195052 ||  || — || February 7, 2002 || Socorro || LINEAR || — || align=right | 2.5 km || 
|-id=053 bgcolor=#E9E9E9
| 195053 ||  || — || February 7, 2002 || Socorro || LINEAR || EUN || align=right | 2.3 km || 
|-id=054 bgcolor=#fefefe
| 195054 ||  || — || February 7, 2002 || Socorro || LINEAR || MAS || align=right data-sort-value="0.99" | 990 m || 
|-id=055 bgcolor=#fefefe
| 195055 ||  || — || February 7, 2002 || Socorro || LINEAR || EUT || align=right data-sort-value="0.92" | 920 m || 
|-id=056 bgcolor=#C2FFFF
| 195056 ||  || — || February 7, 2002 || Socorro || LINEAR || L4 || align=right | 14 km || 
|-id=057 bgcolor=#E9E9E9
| 195057 ||  || — || February 7, 2002 || Socorro || LINEAR || — || align=right | 1.5 km || 
|-id=058 bgcolor=#fefefe
| 195058 ||  || — || February 7, 2002 || Socorro || LINEAR || — || align=right | 1.9 km || 
|-id=059 bgcolor=#E9E9E9
| 195059 ||  || — || February 7, 2002 || Socorro || LINEAR || — || align=right | 1.8 km || 
|-id=060 bgcolor=#fefefe
| 195060 ||  || — || February 7, 2002 || Socorro || LINEAR || MAS || align=right data-sort-value="0.97" | 970 m || 
|-id=061 bgcolor=#E9E9E9
| 195061 ||  || — || February 7, 2002 || Socorro || LINEAR || — || align=right | 1.4 km || 
|-id=062 bgcolor=#E9E9E9
| 195062 ||  || — || February 7, 2002 || Socorro || LINEAR || — || align=right | 1.5 km || 
|-id=063 bgcolor=#E9E9E9
| 195063 ||  || — || February 7, 2002 || Socorro || LINEAR || — || align=right | 1.6 km || 
|-id=064 bgcolor=#E9E9E9
| 195064 ||  || — || February 7, 2002 || Socorro || LINEAR || — || align=right | 2.4 km || 
|-id=065 bgcolor=#fefefe
| 195065 ||  || — || February 7, 2002 || Socorro || LINEAR || MAS || align=right | 1.4 km || 
|-id=066 bgcolor=#E9E9E9
| 195066 ||  || — || February 7, 2002 || Socorro || LINEAR || — || align=right | 1.4 km || 
|-id=067 bgcolor=#fefefe
| 195067 ||  || — || February 7, 2002 || Socorro || LINEAR || ERI || align=right | 3.0 km || 
|-id=068 bgcolor=#E9E9E9
| 195068 ||  || — || February 7, 2002 || Socorro || LINEAR || — || align=right | 1.5 km || 
|-id=069 bgcolor=#E9E9E9
| 195069 ||  || — || February 7, 2002 || Socorro || LINEAR || — || align=right | 2.5 km || 
|-id=070 bgcolor=#fefefe
| 195070 ||  || — || February 7, 2002 || Socorro || LINEAR || NYS || align=right | 1.3 km || 
|-id=071 bgcolor=#fefefe
| 195071 ||  || — || February 7, 2002 || Socorro || LINEAR || — || align=right | 1.3 km || 
|-id=072 bgcolor=#fefefe
| 195072 ||  || — || February 7, 2002 || Socorro || LINEAR || — || align=right | 1.5 km || 
|-id=073 bgcolor=#E9E9E9
| 195073 ||  || — || February 7, 2002 || Socorro || LINEAR || — || align=right | 1.8 km || 
|-id=074 bgcolor=#fefefe
| 195074 ||  || — || February 7, 2002 || Socorro || LINEAR || NYS || align=right | 1.0 km || 
|-id=075 bgcolor=#fefefe
| 195075 ||  || — || February 7, 2002 || Socorro || LINEAR || — || align=right | 1.2 km || 
|-id=076 bgcolor=#E9E9E9
| 195076 ||  || — || February 7, 2002 || Socorro || LINEAR || — || align=right | 1.5 km || 
|-id=077 bgcolor=#E9E9E9
| 195077 ||  || — || February 7, 2002 || Socorro || LINEAR || — || align=right | 1.6 km || 
|-id=078 bgcolor=#E9E9E9
| 195078 ||  || — || February 7, 2002 || Socorro || LINEAR || GEF || align=right | 2.2 km || 
|-id=079 bgcolor=#E9E9E9
| 195079 ||  || — || February 7, 2002 || Socorro || LINEAR || — || align=right | 1.3 km || 
|-id=080 bgcolor=#fefefe
| 195080 ||  || — || February 7, 2002 || Socorro || LINEAR || NYS || align=right | 1.3 km || 
|-id=081 bgcolor=#fefefe
| 195081 ||  || — || February 7, 2002 || Socorro || LINEAR || H || align=right data-sort-value="0.87" | 870 m || 
|-id=082 bgcolor=#fefefe
| 195082 ||  || — || February 7, 2002 || Socorro || LINEAR || — || align=right | 1.6 km || 
|-id=083 bgcolor=#E9E9E9
| 195083 ||  || — || February 7, 2002 || Socorro || LINEAR || — || align=right | 2.1 km || 
|-id=084 bgcolor=#C2FFFF
| 195084 ||  || — || February 7, 2002 || Socorro || LINEAR || L4 || align=right | 14 km || 
|-id=085 bgcolor=#E9E9E9
| 195085 ||  || — || February 7, 2002 || Socorro || LINEAR || — || align=right | 2.2 km || 
|-id=086 bgcolor=#E9E9E9
| 195086 ||  || — || February 7, 2002 || Socorro || LINEAR || — || align=right | 1.3 km || 
|-id=087 bgcolor=#E9E9E9
| 195087 ||  || — || February 7, 2002 || Socorro || LINEAR || HNS || align=right | 2.7 km || 
|-id=088 bgcolor=#E9E9E9
| 195088 ||  || — || February 8, 2002 || Socorro || LINEAR || — || align=right | 1.6 km || 
|-id=089 bgcolor=#fefefe
| 195089 ||  || — || February 8, 2002 || Needville || Needville Obs. || — || align=right | 1.3 km || 
|-id=090 bgcolor=#fefefe
| 195090 ||  || — || February 15, 2002 || Uccle || E. W. Elst, H. Debehogne || — || align=right | 3.5 km || 
|-id=091 bgcolor=#E9E9E9
| 195091 ||  || — || February 14, 2002 || Desert Eagle || W. K. Y. Yeung || — || align=right | 1.3 km || 
|-id=092 bgcolor=#fefefe
| 195092 ||  || — || February 7, 2002 || Kitt Peak || Spacewatch || MAS || align=right | 1.2 km || 
|-id=093 bgcolor=#fefefe
| 195093 ||  || — || February 7, 2002 || Socorro || LINEAR || NYS || align=right | 1.2 km || 
|-id=094 bgcolor=#E9E9E9
| 195094 ||  || — || February 7, 2002 || Socorro || LINEAR || — || align=right | 1.6 km || 
|-id=095 bgcolor=#E9E9E9
| 195095 ||  || — || February 7, 2002 || Socorro || LINEAR || — || align=right | 1.3 km || 
|-id=096 bgcolor=#E9E9E9
| 195096 ||  || — || February 7, 2002 || Socorro || LINEAR || — || align=right | 2.2 km || 
|-id=097 bgcolor=#fefefe
| 195097 ||  || — || February 7, 2002 || Socorro || LINEAR || NYS || align=right data-sort-value="0.90" | 900 m || 
|-id=098 bgcolor=#E9E9E9
| 195098 ||  || — || February 7, 2002 || Socorro || LINEAR || — || align=right | 1.6 km || 
|-id=099 bgcolor=#E9E9E9
| 195099 ||  || — || February 7, 2002 || Socorro || LINEAR || ADE || align=right | 4.4 km || 
|-id=100 bgcolor=#E9E9E9
| 195100 ||  || — || February 7, 2002 || Socorro || LINEAR || — || align=right | 2.5 km || 
|}

195101–195200 

|-bgcolor=#fefefe
| 195101 ||  || — || February 7, 2002 || Socorro || LINEAR || — || align=right | 1.3 km || 
|-id=102 bgcolor=#E9E9E9
| 195102 ||  || — || February 7, 2002 || Socorro || LINEAR || — || align=right | 2.3 km || 
|-id=103 bgcolor=#fefefe
| 195103 ||  || — || February 7, 2002 || Socorro || LINEAR || MAS || align=right data-sort-value="0.99" | 990 m || 
|-id=104 bgcolor=#C2FFFF
| 195104 ||  || — || February 7, 2002 || Socorro || LINEAR || L4 || align=right | 19 km || 
|-id=105 bgcolor=#fefefe
| 195105 ||  || — || February 7, 2002 || Socorro || LINEAR || — || align=right | 1.2 km || 
|-id=106 bgcolor=#E9E9E9
| 195106 ||  || — || February 7, 2002 || Socorro || LINEAR || — || align=right | 3.1 km || 
|-id=107 bgcolor=#fefefe
| 195107 ||  || — || February 7, 2002 || Socorro || LINEAR || NYS || align=right | 1.0 km || 
|-id=108 bgcolor=#E9E9E9
| 195108 ||  || — || February 8, 2002 || Socorro || LINEAR || — || align=right | 2.5 km || 
|-id=109 bgcolor=#fefefe
| 195109 ||  || — || February 8, 2002 || Socorro || LINEAR || — || align=right | 2.3 km || 
|-id=110 bgcolor=#fefefe
| 195110 ||  || — || February 8, 2002 || Socorro || LINEAR || — || align=right | 1.8 km || 
|-id=111 bgcolor=#fefefe
| 195111 ||  || — || February 8, 2002 || Socorro || LINEAR || — || align=right | 1.3 km || 
|-id=112 bgcolor=#fefefe
| 195112 ||  || — || February 8, 2002 || Socorro || LINEAR || ERI || align=right | 1.9 km || 
|-id=113 bgcolor=#E9E9E9
| 195113 ||  || — || February 8, 2002 || Socorro || LINEAR || — || align=right | 1.7 km || 
|-id=114 bgcolor=#E9E9E9
| 195114 ||  || — || February 8, 2002 || Socorro || LINEAR || — || align=right | 1.9 km || 
|-id=115 bgcolor=#fefefe
| 195115 ||  || — || February 8, 2002 || Socorro || LINEAR || — || align=right | 1.4 km || 
|-id=116 bgcolor=#fefefe
| 195116 ||  || — || February 9, 2002 || Socorro || LINEAR || — || align=right | 1.3 km || 
|-id=117 bgcolor=#C2FFFF
| 195117 ||  || — || February 9, 2002 || Socorro || LINEAR || L4 || align=right | 13 km || 
|-id=118 bgcolor=#fefefe
| 195118 ||  || — || February 9, 2002 || Socorro || LINEAR || NYS || align=right | 1.1 km || 
|-id=119 bgcolor=#E9E9E9
| 195119 ||  || — || February 9, 2002 || Socorro || LINEAR || RAF || align=right | 1.7 km || 
|-id=120 bgcolor=#E9E9E9
| 195120 ||  || — || February 9, 2002 || Socorro || LINEAR || — || align=right | 3.9 km || 
|-id=121 bgcolor=#E9E9E9
| 195121 ||  || — || February 9, 2002 || Kitt Peak || Spacewatch || — || align=right | 3.1 km || 
|-id=122 bgcolor=#fefefe
| 195122 ||  || — || February 7, 2002 || Socorro || LINEAR || NYS || align=right | 1.3 km || 
|-id=123 bgcolor=#E9E9E9
| 195123 ||  || — || February 7, 2002 || Socorro || LINEAR || — || align=right | 1.8 km || 
|-id=124 bgcolor=#E9E9E9
| 195124 ||  || — || February 7, 2002 || Socorro || LINEAR || — || align=right | 2.0 km || 
|-id=125 bgcolor=#fefefe
| 195125 ||  || — || February 7, 2002 || Socorro || LINEAR || NYS || align=right data-sort-value="0.99" | 990 m || 
|-id=126 bgcolor=#C2FFFF
| 195126 ||  || — || February 7, 2002 || Socorro || LINEAR || L4 || align=right | 14 km || 
|-id=127 bgcolor=#fefefe
| 195127 ||  || — || February 7, 2002 || Socorro || LINEAR || KLI || align=right | 3.2 km || 
|-id=128 bgcolor=#fefefe
| 195128 ||  || — || February 7, 2002 || Socorro || LINEAR || NYS || align=right | 1.1 km || 
|-id=129 bgcolor=#E9E9E9
| 195129 ||  || — || February 7, 2002 || Socorro || LINEAR || — || align=right | 2.0 km || 
|-id=130 bgcolor=#fefefe
| 195130 ||  || — || February 8, 2002 || Socorro || LINEAR || — || align=right | 1.5 km || 
|-id=131 bgcolor=#E9E9E9
| 195131 ||  || — || February 8, 2002 || Socorro || LINEAR || — || align=right | 4.1 km || 
|-id=132 bgcolor=#E9E9E9
| 195132 ||  || — || February 8, 2002 || Socorro || LINEAR || — || align=right | 3.5 km || 
|-id=133 bgcolor=#E9E9E9
| 195133 ||  || — || February 8, 2002 || Socorro || LINEAR || — || align=right | 3.1 km || 
|-id=134 bgcolor=#fefefe
| 195134 ||  || — || February 8, 2002 || Socorro || LINEAR || — || align=right | 1.4 km || 
|-id=135 bgcolor=#E9E9E9
| 195135 ||  || — || February 8, 2002 || Socorro || LINEAR || — || align=right | 2.5 km || 
|-id=136 bgcolor=#fefefe
| 195136 ||  || — || February 8, 2002 || Socorro || LINEAR || NYS || align=right | 1.1 km || 
|-id=137 bgcolor=#fefefe
| 195137 ||  || — || February 10, 2002 || Socorro || LINEAR || MAS || align=right | 1.3 km || 
|-id=138 bgcolor=#E9E9E9
| 195138 ||  || — || February 10, 2002 || Socorro || LINEAR || — || align=right | 1.4 km || 
|-id=139 bgcolor=#fefefe
| 195139 ||  || — || February 10, 2002 || Socorro || LINEAR || NYS || align=right data-sort-value="0.87" | 870 m || 
|-id=140 bgcolor=#fefefe
| 195140 ||  || — || February 10, 2002 || Socorro || LINEAR || NYS || align=right data-sort-value="0.91" | 910 m || 
|-id=141 bgcolor=#E9E9E9
| 195141 ||  || — || February 10, 2002 || Socorro || LINEAR || — || align=right | 1.3 km || 
|-id=142 bgcolor=#E9E9E9
| 195142 ||  || — || February 10, 2002 || Socorro || LINEAR || — || align=right | 1.3 km || 
|-id=143 bgcolor=#E9E9E9
| 195143 ||  || — || February 10, 2002 || Socorro || LINEAR || fast? || align=right | 1.5 km || 
|-id=144 bgcolor=#fefefe
| 195144 ||  || — || February 10, 2002 || Socorro || LINEAR || — || align=right | 1.1 km || 
|-id=145 bgcolor=#fefefe
| 195145 ||  || — || February 10, 2002 || Socorro || LINEAR || MAS || align=right | 1.1 km || 
|-id=146 bgcolor=#E9E9E9
| 195146 ||  || — || February 10, 2002 || Socorro || LINEAR || MAR || align=right | 2.2 km || 
|-id=147 bgcolor=#fefefe
| 195147 ||  || — || February 10, 2002 || Socorro || LINEAR || — || align=right | 1.4 km || 
|-id=148 bgcolor=#E9E9E9
| 195148 ||  || — || February 10, 2002 || Socorro || LINEAR || — || align=right | 1.2 km || 
|-id=149 bgcolor=#fefefe
| 195149 ||  || — || February 10, 2002 || Socorro || LINEAR || NYS || align=right | 1.4 km || 
|-id=150 bgcolor=#fefefe
| 195150 ||  || — || February 10, 2002 || Socorro || LINEAR || MAS || align=right | 1.2 km || 
|-id=151 bgcolor=#fefefe
| 195151 ||  || — || February 10, 2002 || Socorro || LINEAR || — || align=right | 1.1 km || 
|-id=152 bgcolor=#C2FFFF
| 195152 ||  || — || February 10, 2002 || Socorro || LINEAR || L4 || align=right | 14 km || 
|-id=153 bgcolor=#C2FFFF
| 195153 ||  || — || February 10, 2002 || Socorro || LINEAR || L4 || align=right | 14 km || 
|-id=154 bgcolor=#E9E9E9
| 195154 ||  || — || February 10, 2002 || Socorro || LINEAR || — || align=right | 3.7 km || 
|-id=155 bgcolor=#fefefe
| 195155 ||  || — || February 10, 2002 || Socorro || LINEAR || MAS || align=right data-sort-value="0.94" | 940 m || 
|-id=156 bgcolor=#E9E9E9
| 195156 ||  || — || February 10, 2002 || Socorro || LINEAR || — || align=right | 1.5 km || 
|-id=157 bgcolor=#E9E9E9
| 195157 ||  || — || February 10, 2002 || Socorro || LINEAR || HNS || align=right | 1.6 km || 
|-id=158 bgcolor=#E9E9E9
| 195158 ||  || — || February 10, 2002 || Socorro || LINEAR || — || align=right | 1.3 km || 
|-id=159 bgcolor=#E9E9E9
| 195159 ||  || — || February 11, 2002 || Socorro || LINEAR || — || align=right | 1.9 km || 
|-id=160 bgcolor=#E9E9E9
| 195160 ||  || — || February 14, 2002 || Bergisch Gladbach || W. Bickel || EUN || align=right | 2.0 km || 
|-id=161 bgcolor=#E9E9E9
| 195161 ||  || — || February 3, 2002 || Haleakala || NEAT || — || align=right | 3.2 km || 
|-id=162 bgcolor=#fefefe
| 195162 ||  || — || February 6, 2002 || Palomar || NEAT || V || align=right | 1.3 km || 
|-id=163 bgcolor=#E9E9E9
| 195163 ||  || — || February 12, 2002 || Kitt Peak || Spacewatch || — || align=right | 2.3 km || 
|-id=164 bgcolor=#fefefe
| 195164 ||  || — || February 11, 2002 || Socorro || LINEAR || — || align=right | 1.5 km || 
|-id=165 bgcolor=#d6d6d6
| 195165 ||  || — || February 8, 2002 || Kitt Peak || Spacewatch || KOR || align=right | 1.5 km || 
|-id=166 bgcolor=#E9E9E9
| 195166 ||  || — || February 12, 2002 || Kitt Peak || Spacewatch || — || align=right | 1.7 km || 
|-id=167 bgcolor=#C2FFFF
| 195167 ||  || — || February 8, 2002 || Socorro || LINEAR || L4 || align=right | 17 km || 
|-id=168 bgcolor=#fefefe
| 195168 ||  || — || February 10, 2002 || Socorro || LINEAR || — || align=right | 1.7 km || 
|-id=169 bgcolor=#E9E9E9
| 195169 ||  || — || February 10, 2002 || Socorro || LINEAR || — || align=right | 2.5 km || 
|-id=170 bgcolor=#E9E9E9
| 195170 ||  || — || February 11, 2002 || Socorro || LINEAR || — || align=right | 2.3 km || 
|-id=171 bgcolor=#E9E9E9
| 195171 ||  || — || February 11, 2002 || Socorro || LINEAR || — || align=right | 3.1 km || 
|-id=172 bgcolor=#E9E9E9
| 195172 ||  || — || February 11, 2002 || Socorro || LINEAR || EUN || align=right | 2.1 km || 
|-id=173 bgcolor=#fefefe
| 195173 ||  || — || February 11, 2002 || Socorro || LINEAR || — || align=right | 1.2 km || 
|-id=174 bgcolor=#E9E9E9
| 195174 ||  || — || February 11, 2002 || Socorro || LINEAR || — || align=right | 3.1 km || 
|-id=175 bgcolor=#E9E9E9
| 195175 ||  || — || February 15, 2002 || Haleakala || NEAT || — || align=right | 2.2 km || 
|-id=176 bgcolor=#fefefe
| 195176 ||  || — || February 14, 2002 || Haleakala || NEAT || ERI || align=right | 3.4 km || 
|-id=177 bgcolor=#E9E9E9
| 195177 ||  || — || February 6, 2002 || Kitt Peak || M. W. Buie || MIS || align=right | 3.5 km || 
|-id=178 bgcolor=#E9E9E9
| 195178 ||  || — || February 6, 2002 || Socorro || LINEAR || — || align=right | 1.9 km || 
|-id=179 bgcolor=#fefefe
| 195179 ||  || — || February 6, 2002 || Palomar || NEAT || — || align=right | 1.6 km || 
|-id=180 bgcolor=#E9E9E9
| 195180 ||  || — || February 6, 2002 || Kitt Peak || M. W. Buie || — || align=right | 1.4 km || 
|-id=181 bgcolor=#E9E9E9
| 195181 ||  || — || February 7, 2002 || Palomar || NEAT || — || align=right | 2.0 km || 
|-id=182 bgcolor=#E9E9E9
| 195182 ||  || — || February 7, 2002 || Kitt Peak || M. W. Buie || — || align=right data-sort-value="0.95" | 950 m || 
|-id=183 bgcolor=#E9E9E9
| 195183 ||  || — || February 7, 2002 || Palomar || NEAT || — || align=right | 2.4 km || 
|-id=184 bgcolor=#E9E9E9
| 195184 ||  || — || February 7, 2002 || Kitt Peak || Spacewatch || — || align=right | 3.0 km || 
|-id=185 bgcolor=#fefefe
| 195185 ||  || — || February 7, 2002 || Kitt Peak || M. W. Buie || NYS || align=right | 1.3 km || 
|-id=186 bgcolor=#fefefe
| 195186 ||  || — || February 8, 2002 || Anderson Mesa || LONEOS || — || align=right | 1.6 km || 
|-id=187 bgcolor=#E9E9E9
| 195187 ||  || — || February 8, 2002 || Kitt Peak || M. W. Buie || — || align=right | 1.3 km || 
|-id=188 bgcolor=#C2FFFF
| 195188 ||  || — || February 8, 2002 || Kitt Peak || Spacewatch || L4 || align=right | 13 km || 
|-id=189 bgcolor=#E9E9E9
| 195189 ||  || — || February 8, 2002 || Kitt Peak || M. W. Buie || — || align=right | 1.7 km || 
|-id=190 bgcolor=#E9E9E9
| 195190 ||  || — || February 7, 2002 || Palomar || NEAT || — || align=right | 1.5 km || 
|-id=191 bgcolor=#fefefe
| 195191 Constantinetsang ||  ||  || February 8, 2002 || Kitt Peak || M. W. Buie || MAS || align=right data-sort-value="0.90" | 900 m || 
|-id=192 bgcolor=#fefefe
| 195192 ||  || — || February 9, 2002 || Kitt Peak || Spacewatch || MAS || align=right | 1.1 km || 
|-id=193 bgcolor=#E9E9E9
| 195193 ||  || — || February 9, 2002 || Kitt Peak || Spacewatch || — || align=right | 1.7 km || 
|-id=194 bgcolor=#E9E9E9
| 195194 ||  || — || February 9, 2002 || Kitt Peak || Spacewatch || — || align=right | 1.6 km || 
|-id=195 bgcolor=#E9E9E9
| 195195 ||  || — || February 10, 2002 || Socorro || LINEAR || — || align=right | 1.2 km || 
|-id=196 bgcolor=#fefefe
| 195196 ||  || — || February 10, 2002 || Socorro || LINEAR || — || align=right | 2.5 km || 
|-id=197 bgcolor=#E9E9E9
| 195197 ||  || — || February 10, 2002 || Socorro || LINEAR || — || align=right | 2.0 km || 
|-id=198 bgcolor=#E9E9E9
| 195198 ||  || — || February 10, 2002 || Socorro || LINEAR || — || align=right | 2.8 km || 
|-id=199 bgcolor=#E9E9E9
| 195199 ||  || — || February 10, 2002 || Anderson Mesa || LONEOS || — || align=right | 2.2 km || 
|-id=200 bgcolor=#fefefe
| 195200 ||  || — || February 10, 2002 || Socorro || LINEAR || V || align=right | 1.1 km || 
|}

195201–195300 

|-bgcolor=#E9E9E9
| 195201 ||  || — || February 10, 2002 || Socorro || LINEAR || — || align=right | 1.7 km || 
|-id=202 bgcolor=#E9E9E9
| 195202 ||  || — || February 11, 2002 || Socorro || LINEAR || — || align=right | 3.5 km || 
|-id=203 bgcolor=#E9E9E9
| 195203 ||  || — || February 11, 2002 || Socorro || LINEAR || — || align=right | 2.4 km || 
|-id=204 bgcolor=#d6d6d6
| 195204 ||  || — || February 7, 2002 || Socorro || LINEAR || HIL3:2 || align=right | 7.7 km || 
|-id=205 bgcolor=#fefefe
| 195205 || 2002 DH || — || February 16, 2002 || Eskridge || G. Hug || H || align=right data-sort-value="0.93" | 930 m || 
|-id=206 bgcolor=#E9E9E9
| 195206 ||  || — || February 16, 2002 || Uccle || T. Pauwels || — || align=right | 1.9 km || 
|-id=207 bgcolor=#E9E9E9
| 195207 ||  || — || February 19, 2002 || Socorro || LINEAR || BRU || align=right | 4.1 km || 
|-id=208 bgcolor=#FA8072
| 195208 ||  || — || February 22, 2002 || Socorro || LINEAR || — || align=right | 2.0 km || 
|-id=209 bgcolor=#fefefe
| 195209 ||  || — || February 21, 2002 || Socorro || LINEAR || PHO || align=right | 1.9 km || 
|-id=210 bgcolor=#fefefe
| 195210 ||  || — || February 16, 2002 || Palomar || NEAT || — || align=right | 1.7 km || 
|-id=211 bgcolor=#fefefe
| 195211 ||  || — || February 20, 2002 || Kitt Peak || Spacewatch || — || align=right | 1.2 km || 
|-id=212 bgcolor=#E9E9E9
| 195212 ||  || — || February 19, 2002 || Socorro || LINEAR || MIT || align=right | 3.8 km || 
|-id=213 bgcolor=#E9E9E9
| 195213 ||  || — || February 19, 2002 || Socorro || LINEAR || JUN || align=right | 1.7 km || 
|-id=214 bgcolor=#fefefe
| 195214 ||  || — || February 20, 2002 || Socorro || LINEAR || NYS || align=right | 1.2 km || 
|-id=215 bgcolor=#fefefe
| 195215 ||  || — || February 20, 2002 || Socorro || LINEAR || MAS || align=right | 1.2 km || 
|-id=216 bgcolor=#E9E9E9
| 195216 ||  || — || February 17, 2002 || Palomar || NEAT || — || align=right | 2.4 km || 
|-id=217 bgcolor=#C2FFFF
| 195217 ||  || — || February 20, 2002 || Kitt Peak || Spacewatch || L4 || align=right | 13 km || 
|-id=218 bgcolor=#C2FFFF
| 195218 ||  || — || February 24, 2002 || Palomar || NEAT || L4 || align=right | 12 km || 
|-id=219 bgcolor=#E9E9E9
| 195219 ||  || — || February 16, 2002 || Palomar || NEAT || — || align=right | 2.0 km || 
|-id=220 bgcolor=#E9E9E9
| 195220 ||  || — || February 16, 2002 || Palomar || NEAT || — || align=right | 1.7 km || 
|-id=221 bgcolor=#fefefe
| 195221 ||  || — || February 16, 2002 || Palomar || NEAT || MAS || align=right data-sort-value="0.88" | 880 m || 
|-id=222 bgcolor=#E9E9E9
| 195222 ||  || — || February 16, 2002 || Palomar || NEAT || — || align=right | 1.3 km || 
|-id=223 bgcolor=#fefefe
| 195223 ||  || — || February 20, 2002 || Anderson Mesa || LONEOS || — || align=right | 1.5 km || 
|-id=224 bgcolor=#fefefe
| 195224 ||  || — || February 20, 2002 || Socorro || LINEAR || MAS || align=right data-sort-value="0.99" | 990 m || 
|-id=225 bgcolor=#fefefe
| 195225 ||  || — || February 20, 2002 || Socorro || LINEAR || MAS || align=right | 1.1 km || 
|-id=226 bgcolor=#E9E9E9
| 195226 ||  || — || February 20, 2002 || Socorro || LINEAR || PAD || align=right | 3.5 km || 
|-id=227 bgcolor=#fefefe
| 195227 ||  || — || February 20, 2002 || Socorro || LINEAR || MAS || align=right | 1.0 km || 
|-id=228 bgcolor=#E9E9E9
| 195228 ||  || — || February 21, 2002 || Kvistaberg || UDAS || EUN || align=right | 1.5 km || 
|-id=229 bgcolor=#E9E9E9
| 195229 ||  || — || February 17, 2002 || Palomar || NEAT || — || align=right | 2.0 km || 
|-id=230 bgcolor=#C2FFFF
| 195230 ||  || — || March 10, 2002 || Cima Ekar || ADAS || L4 || align=right | 15 km || 
|-id=231 bgcolor=#E9E9E9
| 195231 ||  || — || March 10, 2002 || Cima Ekar || ADAS || HNS || align=right | 1.2 km || 
|-id=232 bgcolor=#C2FFFF
| 195232 ||  || — || March 12, 2002 || Palomar || NEAT || L4 || align=right | 15 km || 
|-id=233 bgcolor=#E9E9E9
| 195233 ||  || — || March 14, 2002 || Palomar || NEAT || — || align=right | 3.3 km || 
|-id=234 bgcolor=#E9E9E9
| 195234 ||  || — || March 14, 2002 || Desert Eagle || W. K. Y. Yeung || — || align=right | 4.7 km || 
|-id=235 bgcolor=#E9E9E9
| 195235 ||  || — || March 14, 2002 || Desert Eagle || W. K. Y. Yeung || — || align=right | 3.1 km || 
|-id=236 bgcolor=#E9E9E9
| 195236 ||  || — || March 5, 2002 || Haleakala || NEAT || — || align=right | 2.0 km || 
|-id=237 bgcolor=#E9E9E9
| 195237 ||  || — || March 6, 2002 || Palomar || NEAT || — || align=right | 5.0 km || 
|-id=238 bgcolor=#fefefe
| 195238 ||  || — || March 6, 2002 || Socorro || LINEAR || — || align=right | 1.8 km || 
|-id=239 bgcolor=#E9E9E9
| 195239 ||  || — || March 5, 2002 || Kitt Peak || Spacewatch || — || align=right | 2.1 km || 
|-id=240 bgcolor=#E9E9E9
| 195240 ||  || — || March 10, 2002 || Haleakala || NEAT || INO || align=right | 1.7 km || 
|-id=241 bgcolor=#E9E9E9
| 195241 ||  || — || March 10, 2002 || Haleakala || NEAT || — || align=right | 2.9 km || 
|-id=242 bgcolor=#E9E9E9
| 195242 ||  || — || March 5, 2002 || Kitt Peak || Spacewatch || — || align=right | 2.4 km || 
|-id=243 bgcolor=#fefefe
| 195243 ||  || — || March 9, 2002 || Socorro || LINEAR || NYS || align=right | 1.2 km || 
|-id=244 bgcolor=#E9E9E9
| 195244 ||  || — || March 11, 2002 || Palomar || NEAT || — || align=right | 1.5 km || 
|-id=245 bgcolor=#C2FFFF
| 195245 ||  || — || March 9, 2002 || Kitt Peak || Spacewatch || L4 || align=right | 13 km || 
|-id=246 bgcolor=#E9E9E9
| 195246 ||  || — || March 9, 2002 || Socorro || LINEAR || CLO || align=right | 4.4 km || 
|-id=247 bgcolor=#fefefe
| 195247 ||  || — || March 10, 2002 || Socorro || LINEAR || — || align=right | 1.4 km || 
|-id=248 bgcolor=#E9E9E9
| 195248 ||  || — || March 12, 2002 || Socorro || LINEAR || — || align=right | 1.5 km || 
|-id=249 bgcolor=#E9E9E9
| 195249 ||  || — || March 12, 2002 || Socorro || LINEAR || — || align=right | 1.3 km || 
|-id=250 bgcolor=#E9E9E9
| 195250 ||  || — || March 11, 2002 || Palomar || NEAT || — || align=right | 3.4 km || 
|-id=251 bgcolor=#E9E9E9
| 195251 ||  || — || March 11, 2002 || Palomar || NEAT || — || align=right | 2.9 km || 
|-id=252 bgcolor=#E9E9E9
| 195252 ||  || — || March 12, 2002 || Palomar || NEAT || — || align=right data-sort-value="0.95" | 950 m || 
|-id=253 bgcolor=#E9E9E9
| 195253 ||  || — || March 12, 2002 || Palomar || NEAT || — || align=right | 1.4 km || 
|-id=254 bgcolor=#E9E9E9
| 195254 ||  || — || March 12, 2002 || Palomar || NEAT || — || align=right | 3.5 km || 
|-id=255 bgcolor=#fefefe
| 195255 ||  || — || March 12, 2002 || Palomar || NEAT || — || align=right | 1.1 km || 
|-id=256 bgcolor=#E9E9E9
| 195256 ||  || — || March 9, 2002 || Socorro || LINEAR || EUN || align=right | 2.1 km || 
|-id=257 bgcolor=#E9E9E9
| 195257 ||  || — || March 9, 2002 || Socorro || LINEAR || — || align=right | 1.5 km || 
|-id=258 bgcolor=#C2FFFF
| 195258 ||  || — || March 9, 2002 || Socorro || LINEAR || L4 || align=right | 11 km || 
|-id=259 bgcolor=#fefefe
| 195259 ||  || — || March 13, 2002 || Socorro || LINEAR || MAS || align=right | 1.1 km || 
|-id=260 bgcolor=#E9E9E9
| 195260 ||  || — || March 13, 2002 || Socorro || LINEAR || — || align=right | 2.8 km || 
|-id=261 bgcolor=#E9E9E9
| 195261 ||  || — || March 9, 2002 || Socorro || LINEAR || RAF || align=right | 1.4 km || 
|-id=262 bgcolor=#E9E9E9
| 195262 ||  || — || March 9, 2002 || Socorro || LINEAR || — || align=right | 5.5 km || 
|-id=263 bgcolor=#E9E9E9
| 195263 ||  || — || March 13, 2002 || Socorro || LINEAR || — || align=right | 2.2 km || 
|-id=264 bgcolor=#E9E9E9
| 195264 ||  || — || March 13, 2002 || Socorro || LINEAR || — || align=right | 1.3 km || 
|-id=265 bgcolor=#E9E9E9
| 195265 ||  || — || March 13, 2002 || Socorro || LINEAR || — || align=right | 2.1 km || 
|-id=266 bgcolor=#fefefe
| 195266 ||  || — || March 13, 2002 || Socorro || LINEAR || — || align=right | 1.2 km || 
|-id=267 bgcolor=#E9E9E9
| 195267 ||  || — || March 13, 2002 || Socorro || LINEAR || — || align=right | 1.8 km || 
|-id=268 bgcolor=#E9E9E9
| 195268 ||  || — || March 13, 2002 || Socorro || LINEAR || — || align=right | 3.2 km || 
|-id=269 bgcolor=#C2FFFF
| 195269 ||  || — || March 13, 2002 || Socorro || LINEAR || L4 || align=right | 15 km || 
|-id=270 bgcolor=#E9E9E9
| 195270 ||  || — || March 13, 2002 || Socorro || LINEAR || — || align=right | 2.4 km || 
|-id=271 bgcolor=#fefefe
| 195271 ||  || — || March 13, 2002 || Socorro || LINEAR || MAS || align=right | 1.1 km || 
|-id=272 bgcolor=#E9E9E9
| 195272 ||  || — || March 13, 2002 || Socorro || LINEAR || — || align=right | 1.6 km || 
|-id=273 bgcolor=#C2FFFF
| 195273 ||  || — || March 13, 2002 || Socorro || LINEAR || L4 || align=right | 14 km || 
|-id=274 bgcolor=#E9E9E9
| 195274 ||  || — || March 13, 2002 || Socorro || LINEAR || — || align=right | 1.2 km || 
|-id=275 bgcolor=#E9E9E9
| 195275 ||  || — || March 13, 2002 || Socorro || LINEAR || — || align=right | 1.2 km || 
|-id=276 bgcolor=#E9E9E9
| 195276 ||  || — || March 13, 2002 || Socorro || LINEAR || — || align=right | 4.2 km || 
|-id=277 bgcolor=#E9E9E9
| 195277 ||  || — || March 13, 2002 || Socorro || LINEAR || — || align=right | 1.2 km || 
|-id=278 bgcolor=#E9E9E9
| 195278 ||  || — || March 13, 2002 || Socorro || LINEAR || — || align=right | 3.4 km || 
|-id=279 bgcolor=#E9E9E9
| 195279 ||  || — || March 13, 2002 || Socorro || LINEAR || — || align=right | 4.3 km || 
|-id=280 bgcolor=#E9E9E9
| 195280 ||  || — || March 13, 2002 || Socorro || LINEAR || — || align=right | 4.2 km || 
|-id=281 bgcolor=#E9E9E9
| 195281 ||  || — || March 13, 2002 || Socorro || LINEAR || KON || align=right | 4.0 km || 
|-id=282 bgcolor=#E9E9E9
| 195282 ||  || — || March 13, 2002 || Socorro || LINEAR || HNS || align=right | 1.7 km || 
|-id=283 bgcolor=#E9E9E9
| 195283 ||  || — || March 14, 2002 || Palomar || NEAT || — || align=right | 2.9 km || 
|-id=284 bgcolor=#C2FFFF
| 195284 ||  || — || March 10, 2002 || Kitt Peak || Spacewatch || L4 || align=right | 13 km || 
|-id=285 bgcolor=#E9E9E9
| 195285 ||  || — || March 10, 2002 || Haleakala || NEAT || — || align=right | 2.0 km || 
|-id=286 bgcolor=#C2FFFF
| 195286 ||  || — || March 10, 2002 || Haleakala || NEAT || L4 || align=right | 14 km || 
|-id=287 bgcolor=#C2FFFF
| 195287 ||  || — || March 12, 2002 || Palomar || NEAT || L4ERY || align=right | 13 km || 
|-id=288 bgcolor=#E9E9E9
| 195288 ||  || — || March 13, 2002 || Palomar || NEAT || — || align=right | 1.5 km || 
|-id=289 bgcolor=#E9E9E9
| 195289 ||  || — || March 13, 2002 || Palomar || NEAT || — || align=right | 3.8 km || 
|-id=290 bgcolor=#E9E9E9
| 195290 ||  || — || March 13, 2002 || Palomar || NEAT || HNS || align=right | 1.8 km || 
|-id=291 bgcolor=#E9E9E9
| 195291 ||  || — || March 9, 2002 || Socorro || LINEAR || — || align=right | 3.3 km || 
|-id=292 bgcolor=#E9E9E9
| 195292 ||  || — || March 9, 2002 || Socorro || LINEAR || — || align=right | 1.8 km || 
|-id=293 bgcolor=#E9E9E9
| 195293 ||  || — || March 9, 2002 || Socorro || LINEAR || — || align=right | 3.9 km || 
|-id=294 bgcolor=#E9E9E9
| 195294 ||  || — || March 9, 2002 || Socorro || LINEAR || — || align=right | 3.5 km || 
|-id=295 bgcolor=#E9E9E9
| 195295 ||  || — || March 9, 2002 || Socorro || LINEAR || — || align=right | 3.2 km || 
|-id=296 bgcolor=#E9E9E9
| 195296 ||  || — || March 9, 2002 || Socorro || LINEAR || — || align=right | 1.3 km || 
|-id=297 bgcolor=#E9E9E9
| 195297 ||  || — || March 9, 2002 || Socorro || LINEAR || EUN || align=right | 1.8 km || 
|-id=298 bgcolor=#E9E9E9
| 195298 ||  || — || March 12, 2002 || Socorro || LINEAR || — || align=right | 2.3 km || 
|-id=299 bgcolor=#E9E9E9
| 195299 ||  || — || March 13, 2002 || Socorro || LINEAR || — || align=right | 1.7 km || 
|-id=300 bgcolor=#E9E9E9
| 195300 ||  || — || March 14, 2002 || Socorro || LINEAR || — || align=right | 2.7 km || 
|}

195301–195400 

|-bgcolor=#E9E9E9
| 195301 ||  || — || March 14, 2002 || Socorro || LINEAR || — || align=right | 2.1 km || 
|-id=302 bgcolor=#fefefe
| 195302 ||  || — || March 14, 2002 || Socorro || LINEAR || — || align=right data-sort-value="0.86" | 860 m || 
|-id=303 bgcolor=#E9E9E9
| 195303 ||  || — || March 14, 2002 || Socorro || LINEAR || — || align=right | 2.1 km || 
|-id=304 bgcolor=#E9E9E9
| 195304 ||  || — || March 10, 2002 || Kitt Peak || Spacewatch || — || align=right data-sort-value="0.85" | 850 m || 
|-id=305 bgcolor=#E9E9E9
| 195305 ||  || — || March 11, 2002 || Kitt Peak || Spacewatch || MIS || align=right | 4.0 km || 
|-id=306 bgcolor=#E9E9E9
| 195306 ||  || — || March 5, 2002 || Anderson Mesa || LONEOS || HNS || align=right | 2.1 km || 
|-id=307 bgcolor=#E9E9E9
| 195307 ||  || — || March 6, 2002 || Socorro || LINEAR || — || align=right | 2.1 km || 
|-id=308 bgcolor=#C2FFFF
| 195308 ||  || — || March 9, 2002 || Anderson Mesa || LONEOS || L4 || align=right | 12 km || 
|-id=309 bgcolor=#C2FFFF
| 195309 ||  || — || March 9, 2002 || Anderson Mesa || LONEOS || L4 || align=right | 15 km || 
|-id=310 bgcolor=#fefefe
| 195310 ||  || — || March 9, 2002 || Palomar || NEAT || MAS || align=right | 1.3 km || 
|-id=311 bgcolor=#E9E9E9
| 195311 ||  || — || March 9, 2002 || Kitt Peak || Spacewatch || — || align=right | 2.5 km || 
|-id=312 bgcolor=#C2FFFF
| 195312 ||  || — || March 9, 2002 || Kitt Peak || Spacewatch || L4ERY || align=right | 11 km || 
|-id=313 bgcolor=#E9E9E9
| 195313 ||  || — || March 9, 2002 || Kitt Peak || Spacewatch || — || align=right | 1.8 km || 
|-id=314 bgcolor=#E9E9E9
| 195314 ||  || — || March 10, 2002 || Kitt Peak || Spacewatch || — || align=right | 1.0 km || 
|-id=315 bgcolor=#C2FFFF
| 195315 ||  || — || March 10, 2002 || Kitt Peak || Spacewatch || L4 || align=right | 10 km || 
|-id=316 bgcolor=#E9E9E9
| 195316 ||  || — || March 10, 2002 || Kitt Peak || Spacewatch || — || align=right | 1.4 km || 
|-id=317 bgcolor=#E9E9E9
| 195317 ||  || — || March 10, 2002 || Kitt Peak || Spacewatch || — || align=right | 1.8 km || 
|-id=318 bgcolor=#C2FFFF
| 195318 ||  || — || March 11, 2002 || Palomar || NEAT || L4 || align=right | 14 km || 
|-id=319 bgcolor=#fefefe
| 195319 ||  || — || March 9, 2002 || Kitt Peak || Spacewatch || MAS || align=right | 1.0 km || 
|-id=320 bgcolor=#E9E9E9
| 195320 ||  || — || March 9, 2002 || Kitt Peak || Spacewatch || HEN || align=right | 1.2 km || 
|-id=321 bgcolor=#E9E9E9
| 195321 ||  || — || March 10, 2002 || Kitt Peak || Spacewatch || — || align=right | 3.1 km || 
|-id=322 bgcolor=#E9E9E9
| 195322 ||  || — || March 11, 2002 || Kitt Peak || Spacewatch || — || align=right | 3.0 km || 
|-id=323 bgcolor=#E9E9E9
| 195323 ||  || — || March 12, 2002 || Anderson Mesa || LONEOS || — || align=right | 2.1 km || 
|-id=324 bgcolor=#C2FFFF
| 195324 ||  || — || March 12, 2002 || Palomar || NEAT || L4 || align=right | 11 km || 
|-id=325 bgcolor=#E9E9E9
| 195325 ||  || — || March 12, 2002 || Socorro || LINEAR || HNS || align=right | 1.8 km || 
|-id=326 bgcolor=#E9E9E9
| 195326 ||  || — || March 12, 2002 || Palomar || NEAT || — || align=right | 4.0 km || 
|-id=327 bgcolor=#E9E9E9
| 195327 ||  || — || March 12, 2002 || Palomar || NEAT || — || align=right | 2.1 km || 
|-id=328 bgcolor=#E9E9E9
| 195328 ||  || — || March 12, 2002 || Palomar || NEAT || BRG || align=right | 2.9 km || 
|-id=329 bgcolor=#E9E9E9
| 195329 ||  || — || March 12, 2002 || Palomar || NEAT || — || align=right | 1.8 km || 
|-id=330 bgcolor=#E9E9E9
| 195330 ||  || — || March 12, 2002 || Palomar || NEAT || — || align=right | 3.2 km || 
|-id=331 bgcolor=#E9E9E9
| 195331 ||  || — || March 12, 2002 || Palomar || NEAT || — || align=right | 1.5 km || 
|-id=332 bgcolor=#E9E9E9
| 195332 ||  || — || March 13, 2002 || Palomar || NEAT || — || align=right | 2.2 km || 
|-id=333 bgcolor=#E9E9E9
| 195333 ||  || — || March 13, 2002 || Palomar || NEAT || — || align=right | 1.5 km || 
|-id=334 bgcolor=#E9E9E9
| 195334 ||  || — || March 13, 2002 || Palomar || NEAT || — || align=right | 1.5 km || 
|-id=335 bgcolor=#E9E9E9
| 195335 ||  || — || March 12, 2002 || Palomar || NEAT || — || align=right | 1.9 km || 
|-id=336 bgcolor=#E9E9E9
| 195336 ||  || — || March 12, 2002 || Kitt Peak || Spacewatch || — || align=right | 4.1 km || 
|-id=337 bgcolor=#C2FFFF
| 195337 ||  || — || March 12, 2002 || Palomar || NEAT || L4 || align=right | 16 km || 
|-id=338 bgcolor=#E9E9E9
| 195338 ||  || — || March 12, 2002 || Palomar || NEAT || — || align=right | 2.0 km || 
|-id=339 bgcolor=#E9E9E9
| 195339 ||  || — || March 12, 2002 || Palomar || NEAT || — || align=right | 2.1 km || 
|-id=340 bgcolor=#E9E9E9
| 195340 ||  || — || March 14, 2002 || Anderson Mesa || LONEOS || — || align=right | 1.6 km || 
|-id=341 bgcolor=#E9E9E9
| 195341 ||  || — || March 14, 2002 || Anderson Mesa || LONEOS || — || align=right | 1.6 km || 
|-id=342 bgcolor=#E9E9E9
| 195342 ||  || — || March 15, 2002 || Palomar || NEAT || — || align=right | 1.5 km || 
|-id=343 bgcolor=#E9E9E9
| 195343 ||  || — || March 15, 2002 || Palomar || NEAT || — || align=right | 1.3 km || 
|-id=344 bgcolor=#E9E9E9
| 195344 ||  || — || March 15, 2002 || Palomar || NEAT || — || align=right | 1.4 km || 
|-id=345 bgcolor=#E9E9E9
| 195345 ||  || — || March 15, 2002 || Kitt Peak || Spacewatch || — || align=right | 2.4 km || 
|-id=346 bgcolor=#E9E9E9
| 195346 ||  || — || March 15, 2002 || Socorro || LINEAR || MRX || align=right | 1.5 km || 
|-id=347 bgcolor=#d6d6d6
| 195347 ||  || — || March 15, 2002 || Socorro || LINEAR || — || align=right | 4.4 km || 
|-id=348 bgcolor=#E9E9E9
| 195348 ||  || — || March 15, 2002 || Palomar || NEAT || — || align=right | 2.6 km || 
|-id=349 bgcolor=#E9E9E9
| 195349 ||  || — || March 9, 2002 || Socorro || LINEAR || — || align=right | 2.0 km || 
|-id=350 bgcolor=#E9E9E9
| 195350 ||  || — || March 12, 2002 || Socorro || LINEAR || — || align=right | 2.5 km || 
|-id=351 bgcolor=#C2FFFF
| 195351 ||  || — || March 13, 2002 || Palomar || NEAT || L4 || align=right | 10 km || 
|-id=352 bgcolor=#fefefe
| 195352 ||  || — || March 6, 2002 || Palomar || NEAT || — || align=right | 1.2 km || 
|-id=353 bgcolor=#E9E9E9
| 195353 ||  || — || March 18, 2002 || Desert Eagle || W. K. Y. Yeung || — || align=right | 3.5 km || 
|-id=354 bgcolor=#fefefe
| 195354 ||  || — || March 20, 2002 || Socorro || LINEAR || H || align=right data-sort-value="0.92" | 920 m || 
|-id=355 bgcolor=#E9E9E9
| 195355 ||  || — || March 16, 2002 || Socorro || LINEAR || MAR || align=right | 2.2 km || 
|-id=356 bgcolor=#E9E9E9
| 195356 ||  || — || March 16, 2002 || Socorro || LINEAR || — || align=right | 3.5 km || 
|-id=357 bgcolor=#E9E9E9
| 195357 ||  || — || March 16, 2002 || Socorro || LINEAR || — || align=right | 2.6 km || 
|-id=358 bgcolor=#E9E9E9
| 195358 ||  || — || March 16, 2002 || Socorro || LINEAR || — || align=right | 2.5 km || 
|-id=359 bgcolor=#E9E9E9
| 195359 ||  || — || March 16, 2002 || Socorro || LINEAR || — || align=right | 2.0 km || 
|-id=360 bgcolor=#E9E9E9
| 195360 ||  || — || March 16, 2002 || Socorro || LINEAR || — || align=right | 2.7 km || 
|-id=361 bgcolor=#E9E9E9
| 195361 ||  || — || March 16, 2002 || Socorro || LINEAR || — || align=right | 1.3 km || 
|-id=362 bgcolor=#E9E9E9
| 195362 ||  || — || March 16, 2002 || Haleakala || NEAT || — || align=right | 2.3 km || 
|-id=363 bgcolor=#E9E9E9
| 195363 ||  || — || March 18, 2002 || Haleakala || NEAT || — || align=right | 4.3 km || 
|-id=364 bgcolor=#E9E9E9
| 195364 ||  || — || March 19, 2002 || Palomar || NEAT || GER || align=right | 3.4 km || 
|-id=365 bgcolor=#E9E9E9
| 195365 ||  || — || March 19, 2002 || Palomar || NEAT || — || align=right | 2.9 km || 
|-id=366 bgcolor=#E9E9E9
| 195366 ||  || — || March 20, 2002 || Socorro || LINEAR || EUN || align=right | 1.9 km || 
|-id=367 bgcolor=#E9E9E9
| 195367 ||  || — || March 20, 2002 || Socorro || LINEAR || ADE || align=right | 6.1 km || 
|-id=368 bgcolor=#E9E9E9
| 195368 ||  || — || March 20, 2002 || Socorro || LINEAR || — || align=right | 3.1 km || 
|-id=369 bgcolor=#E9E9E9
| 195369 ||  || — || March 20, 2002 || Socorro || LINEAR || — || align=right | 2.3 km || 
|-id=370 bgcolor=#E9E9E9
| 195370 ||  || — || March 20, 2002 || Palomar || NEAT || EUN || align=right | 1.9 km || 
|-id=371 bgcolor=#E9E9E9
| 195371 ||  || — || March 19, 2002 || Anderson Mesa || LONEOS || — || align=right | 1.2 km || 
|-id=372 bgcolor=#E9E9E9
| 195372 ||  || — || March 20, 2002 || Anderson Mesa || LONEOS || — || align=right | 1.6 km || 
|-id=373 bgcolor=#E9E9E9
| 195373 ||  || — || March 20, 2002 || Anderson Mesa || LONEOS || — || align=right | 1.7 km || 
|-id=374 bgcolor=#fefefe
| 195374 ||  || — || March 21, 2002 || Palomar || NEAT || — || align=right | 1.6 km || 
|-id=375 bgcolor=#d6d6d6
| 195375 ||  || — || March 19, 2002 || Anderson Mesa || LONEOS || — || align=right | 6.3 km || 
|-id=376 bgcolor=#E9E9E9
| 195376 ||  || — || March 20, 2002 || Socorro || LINEAR || — || align=right | 2.6 km || 
|-id=377 bgcolor=#E9E9E9
| 195377 ||  || — || March 31, 2002 || Palomar || NEAT || — || align=right | 3.4 km || 
|-id=378 bgcolor=#E9E9E9
| 195378 ||  || — || March 31, 2002 || Palomar || NEAT || EUN || align=right | 1.8 km || 
|-id=379 bgcolor=#E9E9E9
| 195379 ||  || — || March 20, 2002 || Socorro || LINEAR || — || align=right | 4.6 km || 
|-id=380 bgcolor=#E9E9E9
| 195380 || 2002 GY || — || April 3, 2002 || Palomar || NEAT || BRU || align=right | 4.9 km || 
|-id=381 bgcolor=#fefefe
| 195381 ||  || — || April 2, 2002 || Eskridge || Farpoint Obs. || — || align=right | 1.4 km || 
|-id=382 bgcolor=#E9E9E9
| 195382 ||  || — || April 10, 2002 || Palomar || NEAT || GAL || align=right | 2.5 km || 
|-id=383 bgcolor=#fefefe
| 195383 ||  || — || April 10, 2002 || Socorro || LINEAR || H || align=right | 1.1 km || 
|-id=384 bgcolor=#fefefe
| 195384 ||  || — || April 9, 2002 || Socorro || LINEAR || H || align=right data-sort-value="0.92" | 920 m || 
|-id=385 bgcolor=#E9E9E9
| 195385 ||  || — || April 14, 2002 || Desert Eagle || W. K. Y. Yeung || — || align=right | 1.4 km || 
|-id=386 bgcolor=#E9E9E9
| 195386 ||  || — || April 14, 2002 || Desert Eagle || W. K. Y. Yeung || — || align=right | 3.7 km || 
|-id=387 bgcolor=#E9E9E9
| 195387 ||  || — || April 4, 2002 || Palomar || NEAT || TIN || align=right | 1.7 km || 
|-id=388 bgcolor=#E9E9E9
| 195388 ||  || — || April 15, 2002 || Desert Eagle || W. K. Y. Yeung || GER || align=right | 2.2 km || 
|-id=389 bgcolor=#fefefe
| 195389 ||  || — || April 10, 2002 || Socorro || LINEAR || H || align=right | 1.3 km || 
|-id=390 bgcolor=#E9E9E9
| 195390 ||  || — || April 5, 2002 || Bergisch Gladbach || W. Bickel || — || align=right | 2.5 km || 
|-id=391 bgcolor=#fefefe
| 195391 ||  || — || April 10, 2002 || Socorro || LINEAR || H || align=right | 1.0 km || 
|-id=392 bgcolor=#E9E9E9
| 195392 ||  || — || April 14, 2002 || Desert Eagle || W. K. Y. Yeung || — || align=right | 3.6 km || 
|-id=393 bgcolor=#E9E9E9
| 195393 ||  || — || April 14, 2002 || Haleakala || NEAT || — || align=right | 2.8 km || 
|-id=394 bgcolor=#E9E9E9
| 195394 ||  || — || April 14, 2002 || Socorro || LINEAR || GEF || align=right | 2.2 km || 
|-id=395 bgcolor=#E9E9E9
| 195395 ||  || — || April 15, 2002 || Socorro || LINEAR || — || align=right | 1.4 km || 
|-id=396 bgcolor=#E9E9E9
| 195396 ||  || — || April 15, 2002 || Socorro || LINEAR || — || align=right | 1.9 km || 
|-id=397 bgcolor=#E9E9E9
| 195397 ||  || — || April 15, 2002 || Socorro || LINEAR || GEF || align=right | 2.2 km || 
|-id=398 bgcolor=#E9E9E9
| 195398 ||  || — || April 15, 2002 || Socorro || LINEAR || — || align=right | 1.8 km || 
|-id=399 bgcolor=#d6d6d6
| 195399 ||  || — || April 14, 2002 || Socorro || LINEAR || BRA || align=right | 3.3 km || 
|-id=400 bgcolor=#E9E9E9
| 195400 ||  || — || April 14, 2002 || Socorro || LINEAR || — || align=right | 2.4 km || 
|}

195401–195500 

|-bgcolor=#E9E9E9
| 195401 ||  || — || April 14, 2002 || Socorro || LINEAR || — || align=right | 1.9 km || 
|-id=402 bgcolor=#E9E9E9
| 195402 ||  || — || April 14, 2002 || Socorro || LINEAR || — || align=right | 1.6 km || 
|-id=403 bgcolor=#E9E9E9
| 195403 ||  || — || April 14, 2002 || Haleakala || NEAT || — || align=right | 1.6 km || 
|-id=404 bgcolor=#E9E9E9
| 195404 ||  || — || April 15, 2002 || Palomar || NEAT || — || align=right | 5.7 km || 
|-id=405 bgcolor=#E9E9E9
| 195405 Lentyler ||  ||  || April 6, 2002 || Cerro Tololo || M. W. Buie || — || align=right data-sort-value="0.89" | 890 m || 
|-id=406 bgcolor=#E9E9E9
| 195406 ||  || — || April 2, 2002 || Kitt Peak || Spacewatch || — || align=right | 2.1 km || 
|-id=407 bgcolor=#E9E9E9
| 195407 ||  || — || April 3, 2002 || Kitt Peak || Spacewatch || — || align=right | 2.8 km || 
|-id=408 bgcolor=#E9E9E9
| 195408 ||  || — || April 3, 2002 || Kitt Peak || Spacewatch || AGN || align=right | 1.9 km || 
|-id=409 bgcolor=#E9E9E9
| 195409 ||  || — || April 2, 2002 || Kitt Peak || Spacewatch || — || align=right | 4.4 km || 
|-id=410 bgcolor=#E9E9E9
| 195410 ||  || — || April 2, 2002 || Kitt Peak || Spacewatch || — || align=right | 2.1 km || 
|-id=411 bgcolor=#E9E9E9
| 195411 ||  || — || April 2, 2002 || Kitt Peak || Spacewatch || — || align=right | 4.0 km || 
|-id=412 bgcolor=#C2FFFF
| 195412 ||  || — || April 4, 2002 || Palomar || NEAT || L4ERY || align=right | 19 km || 
|-id=413 bgcolor=#E9E9E9
| 195413 ||  || — || April 4, 2002 || Palomar || NEAT || — || align=right | 2.3 km || 
|-id=414 bgcolor=#E9E9E9
| 195414 ||  || — || April 4, 2002 || Palomar || NEAT || — || align=right | 2.9 km || 
|-id=415 bgcolor=#C2FFFF
| 195415 ||  || — || April 4, 2002 || Palomar || NEAT || L4 || align=right | 17 km || 
|-id=416 bgcolor=#E9E9E9
| 195416 ||  || — || April 4, 2002 || Haleakala || NEAT || — || align=right | 2.6 km || 
|-id=417 bgcolor=#E9E9E9
| 195417 ||  || — || April 4, 2002 || Palomar || NEAT || — || align=right | 2.5 km || 
|-id=418 bgcolor=#E9E9E9
| 195418 ||  || — || April 4, 2002 || Palomar || NEAT || — || align=right | 2.2 km || 
|-id=419 bgcolor=#E9E9E9
| 195419 ||  || — || April 4, 2002 || Palomar || NEAT || — || align=right | 2.2 km || 
|-id=420 bgcolor=#E9E9E9
| 195420 ||  || — || April 4, 2002 || Palomar || NEAT || — || align=right | 2.5 km || 
|-id=421 bgcolor=#E9E9E9
| 195421 ||  || — || April 4, 2002 || Haleakala || NEAT || — || align=right | 3.8 km || 
|-id=422 bgcolor=#E9E9E9
| 195422 ||  || — || April 4, 2002 || Haleakala || NEAT || MRX || align=right | 1.9 km || 
|-id=423 bgcolor=#E9E9E9
| 195423 ||  || — || April 5, 2002 || Anderson Mesa || LONEOS || — || align=right | 1.9 km || 
|-id=424 bgcolor=#E9E9E9
| 195424 ||  || — || April 5, 2002 || Palomar || NEAT || KON || align=right | 3.5 km || 
|-id=425 bgcolor=#E9E9E9
| 195425 ||  || — || April 5, 2002 || Palomar || NEAT || — || align=right | 3.4 km || 
|-id=426 bgcolor=#E9E9E9
| 195426 ||  || — || April 5, 2002 || Palomar || NEAT || HEN || align=right | 1.7 km || 
|-id=427 bgcolor=#E9E9E9
| 195427 ||  || — || April 5, 2002 || Palomar || NEAT || — || align=right | 3.0 km || 
|-id=428 bgcolor=#E9E9E9
| 195428 ||  || — || April 5, 2002 || Palomar || NEAT || — || align=right | 2.0 km || 
|-id=429 bgcolor=#E9E9E9
| 195429 ||  || — || April 8, 2002 || Palomar || NEAT || — || align=right | 1.4 km || 
|-id=430 bgcolor=#E9E9E9
| 195430 ||  || — || April 8, 2002 || Kitt Peak || Spacewatch || EUN || align=right | 2.3 km || 
|-id=431 bgcolor=#E9E9E9
| 195431 ||  || — || April 8, 2002 || Palomar || NEAT || — || align=right | 1.9 km || 
|-id=432 bgcolor=#E9E9E9
| 195432 ||  || — || April 8, 2002 || Palomar || NEAT || — || align=right | 2.8 km || 
|-id=433 bgcolor=#E9E9E9
| 195433 ||  || — || April 8, 2002 || Palomar || NEAT || MIS || align=right | 2.9 km || 
|-id=434 bgcolor=#E9E9E9
| 195434 ||  || — || April 8, 2002 || Kitt Peak || Spacewatch || — || align=right | 2.5 km || 
|-id=435 bgcolor=#E9E9E9
| 195435 ||  || — || April 8, 2002 || Palomar || NEAT || — || align=right | 2.5 km || 
|-id=436 bgcolor=#E9E9E9
| 195436 ||  || — || April 8, 2002 || Palomar || NEAT || — || align=right | 2.8 km || 
|-id=437 bgcolor=#E9E9E9
| 195437 ||  || — || April 8, 2002 || Palomar || NEAT || — || align=right | 2.6 km || 
|-id=438 bgcolor=#E9E9E9
| 195438 ||  || — || April 8, 2002 || Palomar || NEAT || — || align=right | 4.5 km || 
|-id=439 bgcolor=#E9E9E9
| 195439 ||  || — || April 9, 2002 || Anderson Mesa || LONEOS || — || align=right | 2.9 km || 
|-id=440 bgcolor=#E9E9E9
| 195440 ||  || — || April 9, 2002 || Anderson Mesa || LONEOS || — || align=right | 1.8 km || 
|-id=441 bgcolor=#E9E9E9
| 195441 ||  || — || April 9, 2002 || Anderson Mesa || LONEOS || NEM || align=right | 3.3 km || 
|-id=442 bgcolor=#E9E9E9
| 195442 ||  || — || April 9, 2002 || Socorro || LINEAR || — || align=right | 1.6 km || 
|-id=443 bgcolor=#fefefe
| 195443 ||  || — || April 9, 2002 || Anderson Mesa || LONEOS || — || align=right | 2.1 km || 
|-id=444 bgcolor=#E9E9E9
| 195444 ||  || — || April 9, 2002 || Anderson Mesa || LONEOS || — || align=right | 3.8 km || 
|-id=445 bgcolor=#E9E9E9
| 195445 ||  || — || April 9, 2002 || Anderson Mesa || LONEOS || MAR || align=right | 2.0 km || 
|-id=446 bgcolor=#E9E9E9
| 195446 ||  || — || April 10, 2002 || Socorro || LINEAR || — || align=right | 2.9 km || 
|-id=447 bgcolor=#E9E9E9
| 195447 ||  || — || April 10, 2002 || Socorro || LINEAR || NEM || align=right | 3.5 km || 
|-id=448 bgcolor=#E9E9E9
| 195448 ||  || — || April 10, 2002 || Socorro || LINEAR || — || align=right | 2.0 km || 
|-id=449 bgcolor=#E9E9E9
| 195449 ||  || — || April 10, 2002 || Socorro || LINEAR || — || align=right | 4.2 km || 
|-id=450 bgcolor=#E9E9E9
| 195450 ||  || — || April 10, 2002 || Socorro || LINEAR || — || align=right | 2.1 km || 
|-id=451 bgcolor=#E9E9E9
| 195451 ||  || — || April 10, 2002 || Socorro || LINEAR || HNS || align=right | 1.7 km || 
|-id=452 bgcolor=#E9E9E9
| 195452 ||  || — || April 8, 2002 || Palomar || NEAT || PAD || align=right | 4.1 km || 
|-id=453 bgcolor=#E9E9E9
| 195453 ||  || — || April 9, 2002 || Socorro || LINEAR || DOR || align=right | 4.0 km || 
|-id=454 bgcolor=#E9E9E9
| 195454 ||  || — || April 9, 2002 || Palomar || NEAT || — || align=right | 1.1 km || 
|-id=455 bgcolor=#E9E9E9
| 195455 ||  || — || April 9, 2002 || Socorro || LINEAR || — || align=right | 3.3 km || 
|-id=456 bgcolor=#E9E9E9
| 195456 ||  || — || April 9, 2002 || Socorro || LINEAR || HNS || align=right | 2.0 km || 
|-id=457 bgcolor=#E9E9E9
| 195457 ||  || — || April 9, 2002 || Socorro || LINEAR || — || align=right | 2.7 km || 
|-id=458 bgcolor=#E9E9E9
| 195458 ||  || — || April 9, 2002 || Socorro || LINEAR || — || align=right | 4.4 km || 
|-id=459 bgcolor=#E9E9E9
| 195459 ||  || — || April 10, 2002 || Socorro || LINEAR || — || align=right | 2.8 km || 
|-id=460 bgcolor=#E9E9E9
| 195460 ||  || — || April 10, 2002 || Socorro || LINEAR || — || align=right | 1.8 km || 
|-id=461 bgcolor=#E9E9E9
| 195461 ||  || — || April 10, 2002 || Socorro || LINEAR || — || align=right | 1.7 km || 
|-id=462 bgcolor=#E9E9E9
| 195462 ||  || — || April 10, 2002 || Socorro || LINEAR || — || align=right | 2.6 km || 
|-id=463 bgcolor=#E9E9E9
| 195463 ||  || — || April 10, 2002 || Socorro || LINEAR || GEF || align=right | 2.1 km || 
|-id=464 bgcolor=#E9E9E9
| 195464 ||  || — || April 10, 2002 || Socorro || LINEAR || — || align=right | 4.4 km || 
|-id=465 bgcolor=#E9E9E9
| 195465 ||  || — || April 10, 2002 || Socorro || LINEAR || — || align=right | 2.5 km || 
|-id=466 bgcolor=#E9E9E9
| 195466 ||  || — || April 10, 2002 || Socorro || LINEAR || — || align=right | 3.4 km || 
|-id=467 bgcolor=#C2FFFF
| 195467 ||  || — || April 11, 2002 || Socorro || LINEAR || L4 || align=right | 15 km || 
|-id=468 bgcolor=#E9E9E9
| 195468 ||  || — || April 11, 2002 || Socorro || LINEAR || — || align=right | 1.7 km || 
|-id=469 bgcolor=#E9E9E9
| 195469 ||  || — || April 11, 2002 || Socorro || LINEAR || — || align=right | 3.5 km || 
|-id=470 bgcolor=#E9E9E9
| 195470 ||  || — || April 12, 2002 || Palomar || NEAT || — || align=right | 1.2 km || 
|-id=471 bgcolor=#E9E9E9
| 195471 ||  || — || April 12, 2002 || Socorro || LINEAR || MAR || align=right | 1.7 km || 
|-id=472 bgcolor=#E9E9E9
| 195472 ||  || — || April 12, 2002 || Socorro || LINEAR || — || align=right | 1.7 km || 
|-id=473 bgcolor=#E9E9E9
| 195473 ||  || — || April 12, 2002 || Socorro || LINEAR || — || align=right | 3.3 km || 
|-id=474 bgcolor=#d6d6d6
| 195474 ||  || — || April 12, 2002 || Socorro || LINEAR || — || align=right | 3.5 km || 
|-id=475 bgcolor=#E9E9E9
| 195475 ||  || — || April 12, 2002 || Socorro || LINEAR || — || align=right | 1.1 km || 
|-id=476 bgcolor=#E9E9E9
| 195476 ||  || — || April 12, 2002 || Socorro || LINEAR || — || align=right | 2.3 km || 
|-id=477 bgcolor=#E9E9E9
| 195477 ||  || — || April 12, 2002 || Socorro || LINEAR || AGN || align=right | 1.6 km || 
|-id=478 bgcolor=#E9E9E9
| 195478 ||  || — || April 12, 2002 || Socorro || LINEAR || — || align=right | 3.0 km || 
|-id=479 bgcolor=#E9E9E9
| 195479 ||  || — || April 12, 2002 || Socorro || LINEAR || — || align=right | 1.6 km || 
|-id=480 bgcolor=#E9E9E9
| 195480 ||  || — || April 12, 2002 || Socorro || LINEAR || — || align=right | 2.8 km || 
|-id=481 bgcolor=#E9E9E9
| 195481 ||  || — || April 12, 2002 || Socorro || LINEAR || AEO || align=right | 1.6 km || 
|-id=482 bgcolor=#E9E9E9
| 195482 ||  || — || April 12, 2002 || Socorro || LINEAR || WIT || align=right | 1.7 km || 
|-id=483 bgcolor=#E9E9E9
| 195483 ||  || — || April 12, 2002 || Palomar || NEAT || — || align=right | 2.1 km || 
|-id=484 bgcolor=#E9E9E9
| 195484 ||  || — || April 13, 2002 || Kitt Peak || Spacewatch || — || align=right | 3.5 km || 
|-id=485 bgcolor=#E9E9E9
| 195485 ||  || — || April 13, 2002 || Palomar || NEAT || GEF || align=right | 2.2 km || 
|-id=486 bgcolor=#E9E9E9
| 195486 ||  || — || April 12, 2002 || Socorro || LINEAR || — || align=right | 2.2 km || 
|-id=487 bgcolor=#E9E9E9
| 195487 ||  || — || April 13, 2002 || Palomar || NEAT || — || align=right | 2.7 km || 
|-id=488 bgcolor=#E9E9E9
| 195488 ||  || — || April 14, 2002 || Kitt Peak || Spacewatch || WIT || align=right | 1.7 km || 
|-id=489 bgcolor=#E9E9E9
| 195489 ||  || — || April 14, 2002 || Socorro || LINEAR || EUN || align=right | 2.1 km || 
|-id=490 bgcolor=#C2FFFF
| 195490 ||  || — || April 14, 2002 || Socorro || LINEAR || L4 || align=right | 11 km || 
|-id=491 bgcolor=#E9E9E9
| 195491 ||  || — || April 14, 2002 || Palomar || NEAT || — || align=right | 2.7 km || 
|-id=492 bgcolor=#E9E9E9
| 195492 ||  || — || April 15, 2002 || Palomar || NEAT || — || align=right | 2.2 km || 
|-id=493 bgcolor=#E9E9E9
| 195493 ||  || — || April 15, 2002 || Anderson Mesa || LONEOS || — || align=right | 2.0 km || 
|-id=494 bgcolor=#E9E9E9
| 195494 ||  || — || April 14, 2002 || Palomar || NEAT || — || align=right | 1.7 km || 
|-id=495 bgcolor=#C2FFFF
| 195495 ||  || — || April 14, 2002 || Palomar || NEAT || L4 || align=right | 11 km || 
|-id=496 bgcolor=#E9E9E9
| 195496 ||  || — || April 14, 2002 || Palomar || NEAT || — || align=right | 3.0 km || 
|-id=497 bgcolor=#E9E9E9
| 195497 ||  || — || April 14, 2002 || Palomar || NEAT || — || align=right | 2.2 km || 
|-id=498 bgcolor=#E9E9E9
| 195498 ||  || — || April 9, 2002 || Socorro || LINEAR || — || align=right | 2.5 km || 
|-id=499 bgcolor=#E9E9E9
| 195499 ||  || — || April 9, 2002 || Socorro || LINEAR || — || align=right | 2.6 km || 
|-id=500 bgcolor=#E9E9E9
| 195500 ||  || — || April 9, 2002 || Socorro || LINEAR || — || align=right | 1.4 km || 
|}

195501–195600 

|-bgcolor=#E9E9E9
| 195501 ||  || — || April 9, 2002 || Socorro || LINEAR || RAF || align=right | 1.4 km || 
|-id=502 bgcolor=#E9E9E9
| 195502 ||  || — || April 10, 2002 || Socorro || LINEAR || — || align=right | 3.2 km || 
|-id=503 bgcolor=#E9E9E9
| 195503 ||  || — || April 11, 2002 || Socorro || LINEAR || — || align=right | 2.3 km || 
|-id=504 bgcolor=#E9E9E9
| 195504 ||  || — || April 12, 2002 || Palomar || M. White, M. Collins || HNS || align=right | 1.6 km || 
|-id=505 bgcolor=#C2FFFF
| 195505 ||  || — || April 14, 2002 || Palomar || NEAT || L4 || align=right | 11 km || 
|-id=506 bgcolor=#E9E9E9
| 195506 ||  || — || April 10, 2002 || Socorro || LINEAR || GEF || align=right | 2.6 km || 
|-id=507 bgcolor=#E9E9E9
| 195507 ||  || — || April 15, 2002 || Palomar || NEAT || — || align=right | 2.7 km || 
|-id=508 bgcolor=#E9E9E9
| 195508 || 2002 HJ || — || April 16, 2002 || Desert Eagle || W. K. Y. Yeung || — || align=right | 4.1 km || 
|-id=509 bgcolor=#FA8072
| 195509 ||  || — || April 17, 2002 || Socorro || LINEAR || H || align=right | 1.1 km || 
|-id=510 bgcolor=#E9E9E9
| 195510 ||  || — || April 16, 2002 || Socorro || LINEAR || DOR || align=right | 6.6 km || 
|-id=511 bgcolor=#fefefe
| 195511 ||  || — || April 19, 2002 || Emerald Lane || L. Ball || NYS || align=right data-sort-value="0.97" | 970 m || 
|-id=512 bgcolor=#E9E9E9
| 195512 ||  || — || April 17, 2002 || Palomar || NEAT || EUN || align=right | 2.2 km || 
|-id=513 bgcolor=#E9E9E9
| 195513 ||  || — || April 20, 2002 || Kitt Peak || Spacewatch || HEN || align=right | 1.8 km || 
|-id=514 bgcolor=#E9E9E9
| 195514 ||  || — || April 16, 2002 || Socorro || LINEAR || — || align=right | 4.3 km || 
|-id=515 bgcolor=#E9E9E9
| 195515 ||  || — || April 16, 2002 || Socorro || LINEAR || PAE || align=right | 4.1 km || 
|-id=516 bgcolor=#E9E9E9
| 195516 ||  || — || April 17, 2002 || Socorro || LINEAR || — || align=right | 2.2 km || 
|-id=517 bgcolor=#E9E9E9
| 195517 ||  || — || May 4, 2002 || Desert Eagle || W. K. Y. Yeung || DOR || align=right | 6.2 km || 
|-id=518 bgcolor=#fefefe
| 195518 ||  || — || May 5, 2002 || Palomar || NEAT || KLI || align=right | 3.3 km || 
|-id=519 bgcolor=#E9E9E9
| 195519 ||  || — || May 4, 2002 || Palomar || NEAT || GEF || align=right | 1.9 km || 
|-id=520 bgcolor=#E9E9E9
| 195520 ||  || — || May 6, 2002 || Palomar || NEAT || INO || align=right | 2.2 km || 
|-id=521 bgcolor=#E9E9E9
| 195521 ||  || — || May 6, 2002 || Palomar || NEAT || — || align=right | 4.8 km || 
|-id=522 bgcolor=#E9E9E9
| 195522 ||  || — || May 7, 2002 || Palomar || NEAT || — || align=right | 1.7 km || 
|-id=523 bgcolor=#E9E9E9
| 195523 ||  || — || May 7, 2002 || Palomar || NEAT || WIT || align=right | 1.8 km || 
|-id=524 bgcolor=#E9E9E9
| 195524 ||  || — || May 7, 2002 || Palomar || NEAT || — || align=right | 4.2 km || 
|-id=525 bgcolor=#E9E9E9
| 195525 ||  || — || May 8, 2002 || Haleakala || NEAT || — || align=right | 3.0 km || 
|-id=526 bgcolor=#E9E9E9
| 195526 ||  || — || May 8, 2002 || Socorro || LINEAR || MIS || align=right | 2.1 km || 
|-id=527 bgcolor=#E9E9E9
| 195527 ||  || — || May 8, 2002 || Socorro || LINEAR || — || align=right | 1.8 km || 
|-id=528 bgcolor=#E9E9E9
| 195528 ||  || — || May 8, 2002 || Socorro || LINEAR || RAF || align=right | 1.7 km || 
|-id=529 bgcolor=#d6d6d6
| 195529 ||  || — || May 9, 2002 || Socorro || LINEAR || FIR || align=right | 5.3 km || 
|-id=530 bgcolor=#d6d6d6
| 195530 ||  || — || May 9, 2002 || Socorro || LINEAR || — || align=right | 3.5 km || 
|-id=531 bgcolor=#E9E9E9
| 195531 ||  || — || May 9, 2002 || Socorro || LINEAR || — || align=right | 4.3 km || 
|-id=532 bgcolor=#E9E9E9
| 195532 ||  || — || May 9, 2002 || Socorro || LINEAR || HNS || align=right | 1.9 km || 
|-id=533 bgcolor=#E9E9E9
| 195533 ||  || — || May 8, 2002 || Haleakala || NEAT || — || align=right | 2.1 km || 
|-id=534 bgcolor=#E9E9E9
| 195534 ||  || — || May 8, 2002 || Socorro || LINEAR || MIT || align=right | 4.3 km || 
|-id=535 bgcolor=#E9E9E9
| 195535 ||  || — || May 8, 2002 || Socorro || LINEAR || — || align=right | 2.4 km || 
|-id=536 bgcolor=#E9E9E9
| 195536 ||  || — || May 9, 2002 || Socorro || LINEAR || — || align=right | 5.1 km || 
|-id=537 bgcolor=#E9E9E9
| 195537 ||  || — || May 9, 2002 || Socorro || LINEAR || — || align=right | 5.5 km || 
|-id=538 bgcolor=#d6d6d6
| 195538 ||  || — || May 9, 2002 || Socorro || LINEAR || — || align=right | 3.4 km || 
|-id=539 bgcolor=#E9E9E9
| 195539 ||  || — || May 9, 2002 || Socorro || LINEAR || — || align=right | 2.3 km || 
|-id=540 bgcolor=#E9E9E9
| 195540 ||  || — || May 9, 2002 || Socorro || LINEAR || — || align=right | 2.7 km || 
|-id=541 bgcolor=#E9E9E9
| 195541 ||  || — || May 9, 2002 || Socorro || LINEAR || — || align=right | 2.5 km || 
|-id=542 bgcolor=#E9E9E9
| 195542 ||  || — || May 9, 2002 || Socorro || LINEAR || — || align=right | 3.5 km || 
|-id=543 bgcolor=#E9E9E9
| 195543 ||  || — || May 9, 2002 || Socorro || LINEAR || — || align=right | 2.7 km || 
|-id=544 bgcolor=#E9E9E9
| 195544 ||  || — || May 9, 2002 || Socorro || LINEAR || GEF || align=right | 2.2 km || 
|-id=545 bgcolor=#E9E9E9
| 195545 ||  || — || May 10, 2002 || Socorro || LINEAR || PAD || align=right | 3.1 km || 
|-id=546 bgcolor=#E9E9E9
| 195546 ||  || — || May 8, 2002 || Socorro || LINEAR || — || align=right | 3.9 km || 
|-id=547 bgcolor=#E9E9E9
| 195547 ||  || — || May 8, 2002 || Socorro || LINEAR || — || align=right | 1.8 km || 
|-id=548 bgcolor=#d6d6d6
| 195548 ||  || — || May 9, 2002 || Socorro || LINEAR || — || align=right | 4.0 km || 
|-id=549 bgcolor=#E9E9E9
| 195549 ||  || — || May 10, 2002 || Socorro || LINEAR || — || align=right | 3.7 km || 
|-id=550 bgcolor=#E9E9E9
| 195550 ||  || — || May 10, 2002 || Socorro || LINEAR || — || align=right | 4.3 km || 
|-id=551 bgcolor=#E9E9E9
| 195551 ||  || — || May 10, 2002 || Socorro || LINEAR || — || align=right | 4.2 km || 
|-id=552 bgcolor=#d6d6d6
| 195552 ||  || — || May 11, 2002 || Socorro || LINEAR || — || align=right | 5.3 km || 
|-id=553 bgcolor=#E9E9E9
| 195553 ||  || — || May 11, 2002 || Palomar || NEAT || — || align=right | 1.6 km || 
|-id=554 bgcolor=#fefefe
| 195554 ||  || — || May 8, 2002 || Socorro || LINEAR || H || align=right data-sort-value="0.86" | 860 m || 
|-id=555 bgcolor=#E9E9E9
| 195555 ||  || — || May 6, 2002 || Socorro || LINEAR || MIT || align=right | 3.7 km || 
|-id=556 bgcolor=#E9E9E9
| 195556 ||  || — || May 7, 2002 || Socorro || LINEAR || — || align=right | 4.9 km || 
|-id=557 bgcolor=#E9E9E9
| 195557 ||  || — || May 7, 2002 || Socorro || LINEAR || — || align=right | 4.5 km || 
|-id=558 bgcolor=#E9E9E9
| 195558 ||  || — || May 8, 2002 || Socorro || LINEAR || RAF || align=right | 1.7 km || 
|-id=559 bgcolor=#E9E9E9
| 195559 ||  || — || May 8, 2002 || Socorro || LINEAR || MIT || align=right | 4.5 km || 
|-id=560 bgcolor=#E9E9E9
| 195560 ||  || — || May 8, 2002 || Socorro || LINEAR || — || align=right | 4.8 km || 
|-id=561 bgcolor=#E9E9E9
| 195561 ||  || — || May 8, 2002 || Socorro || LINEAR || — || align=right | 3.5 km || 
|-id=562 bgcolor=#E9E9E9
| 195562 ||  || — || May 11, 2002 || Socorro || LINEAR || — || align=right | 2.6 km || 
|-id=563 bgcolor=#E9E9E9
| 195563 ||  || — || May 11, 2002 || Socorro || LINEAR || — || align=right | 1.8 km || 
|-id=564 bgcolor=#E9E9E9
| 195564 ||  || — || May 11, 2002 || Socorro || LINEAR || — || align=right | 3.6 km || 
|-id=565 bgcolor=#E9E9E9
| 195565 ||  || — || May 11, 2002 || Socorro || LINEAR || — || align=right | 2.7 km || 
|-id=566 bgcolor=#E9E9E9
| 195566 ||  || — || May 11, 2002 || Socorro || LINEAR || — || align=right | 2.2 km || 
|-id=567 bgcolor=#E9E9E9
| 195567 ||  || — || May 11, 2002 || Socorro || LINEAR || — || align=right | 2.0 km || 
|-id=568 bgcolor=#E9E9E9
| 195568 ||  || — || May 11, 2002 || Socorro || LINEAR || HNS || align=right | 1.9 km || 
|-id=569 bgcolor=#E9E9E9
| 195569 ||  || — || May 11, 2002 || Socorro || LINEAR || WIT || align=right | 1.6 km || 
|-id=570 bgcolor=#E9E9E9
| 195570 ||  || — || May 11, 2002 || Socorro || LINEAR || — || align=right | 4.8 km || 
|-id=571 bgcolor=#E9E9E9
| 195571 ||  || — || May 11, 2002 || Socorro || LINEAR || — || align=right | 4.1 km || 
|-id=572 bgcolor=#d6d6d6
| 195572 ||  || — || May 11, 2002 || Socorro || LINEAR || — || align=right | 3.0 km || 
|-id=573 bgcolor=#E9E9E9
| 195573 ||  || — || May 11, 2002 || Socorro || LINEAR || HOF || align=right | 4.3 km || 
|-id=574 bgcolor=#E9E9E9
| 195574 ||  || — || May 12, 2002 || Palomar || NEAT || — || align=right | 3.0 km || 
|-id=575 bgcolor=#E9E9E9
| 195575 ||  || — || May 12, 2002 || Palomar || NEAT || — || align=right | 4.6 km || 
|-id=576 bgcolor=#fefefe
| 195576 ||  || — || May 11, 2002 || Socorro || LINEAR || H || align=right | 1.0 km || 
|-id=577 bgcolor=#E9E9E9
| 195577 ||  || — || May 12, 2002 || Ondřejov || P. Kušnirák || — || align=right | 4.8 km || 
|-id=578 bgcolor=#d6d6d6
| 195578 ||  || — || May 11, 2002 || Socorro || LINEAR || — || align=right | 6.9 km || 
|-id=579 bgcolor=#d6d6d6
| 195579 ||  || — || May 6, 2002 || Socorro || LINEAR || EUP || align=right | 7.2 km || 
|-id=580 bgcolor=#E9E9E9
| 195580 ||  || — || May 9, 2002 || Socorro || LINEAR || — || align=right | 3.8 km || 
|-id=581 bgcolor=#E9E9E9
| 195581 ||  || — || May 10, 2002 || Socorro || LINEAR || — || align=right | 2.5 km || 
|-id=582 bgcolor=#E9E9E9
| 195582 ||  || — || May 11, 2002 || Socorro || LINEAR || — || align=right | 3.9 km || 
|-id=583 bgcolor=#E9E9E9
| 195583 ||  || — || May 5, 2002 || Palomar || NEAT || — || align=right | 3.5 km || 
|-id=584 bgcolor=#E9E9E9
| 195584 ||  || — || May 5, 2002 || Anderson Mesa || LONEOS || — || align=right | 2.6 km || 
|-id=585 bgcolor=#E9E9E9
| 195585 ||  || — || May 5, 2002 || Palomar || NEAT || ADE || align=right | 4.0 km || 
|-id=586 bgcolor=#E9E9E9
| 195586 ||  || — || May 5, 2002 || Palomar || NEAT || — || align=right | 2.3 km || 
|-id=587 bgcolor=#E9E9E9
| 195587 ||  || — || May 5, 2002 || Palomar || NEAT || KAZ || align=right | 2.2 km || 
|-id=588 bgcolor=#E9E9E9
| 195588 ||  || — || May 6, 2002 || Palomar || NEAT || — || align=right | 3.4 km || 
|-id=589 bgcolor=#E9E9E9
| 195589 ||  || — || May 7, 2002 || Palomar || NEAT || HEN || align=right | 1.7 km || 
|-id=590 bgcolor=#E9E9E9
| 195590 ||  || — || May 7, 2002 || Anderson Mesa || LONEOS || WIT || align=right | 2.1 km || 
|-id=591 bgcolor=#E9E9E9
| 195591 ||  || — || May 8, 2002 || Socorro || LINEAR || — || align=right | 4.9 km || 
|-id=592 bgcolor=#E9E9E9
| 195592 ||  || — || May 8, 2002 || Socorro || LINEAR || — || align=right | 1.6 km || 
|-id=593 bgcolor=#E9E9E9
| 195593 ||  || — || May 8, 2002 || Socorro || LINEAR || — || align=right | 4.8 km || 
|-id=594 bgcolor=#E9E9E9
| 195594 ||  || — || May 9, 2002 || Palomar || NEAT || — || align=right | 2.9 km || 
|-id=595 bgcolor=#E9E9E9
| 195595 ||  || — || May 9, 2002 || Socorro || LINEAR || GEF || align=right | 2.6 km || 
|-id=596 bgcolor=#E9E9E9
| 195596 ||  || — || May 10, 2002 || Palomar || NEAT || — || align=right | 3.0 km || 
|-id=597 bgcolor=#E9E9E9
| 195597 ||  || — || May 13, 2002 || Palomar || NEAT || — || align=right | 4.1 km || 
|-id=598 bgcolor=#E9E9E9
| 195598 ||  || — || May 13, 2002 || Socorro || LINEAR || — || align=right | 1.3 km || 
|-id=599 bgcolor=#E9E9E9
| 195599 ||  || — || May 15, 2002 || Palomar || NEAT || — || align=right | 2.4 km || 
|-id=600 bgcolor=#d6d6d6
| 195600 Scheithauer ||  ||  || May 15, 2002 || Palomar || M. Meyer || — || align=right | 4.4 km || 
|}

195601–195700 

|-bgcolor=#E9E9E9
| 195601 ||  || — || May 9, 2002 || Palomar || NEAT || AGN || align=right | 2.0 km || 
|-id=602 bgcolor=#E9E9E9
| 195602 ||  || — || May 17, 2002 || Palomar || NEAT || — || align=right | 2.1 km || 
|-id=603 bgcolor=#E9E9E9
| 195603 ||  || — || May 17, 2002 || Palomar || NEAT || ADE || align=right | 4.5 km || 
|-id=604 bgcolor=#E9E9E9
| 195604 ||  || — || May 18, 2002 || Palomar || NEAT || — || align=right | 2.1 km || 
|-id=605 bgcolor=#E9E9E9
| 195605 ||  || — || May 16, 2002 || Socorro || LINEAR || — || align=right | 2.1 km || 
|-id=606 bgcolor=#E9E9E9
| 195606 ||  || — || May 16, 2002 || Socorro || LINEAR || WIT || align=right | 2.0 km || 
|-id=607 bgcolor=#E9E9E9
| 195607 ||  || — || May 16, 2002 || Socorro || LINEAR || — || align=right | 2.1 km || 
|-id=608 bgcolor=#fefefe
| 195608 ||  || — || May 17, 2002 || Socorro || LINEAR || H || align=right | 1.1 km || 
|-id=609 bgcolor=#E9E9E9
| 195609 ||  || — || May 18, 2002 || Palomar || NEAT || — || align=right | 2.8 km || 
|-id=610 bgcolor=#E9E9E9
| 195610 ||  || — || June 2, 2002 || Palomar || NEAT || — || align=right | 2.2 km || 
|-id=611 bgcolor=#E9E9E9
| 195611 ||  || — || June 5, 2002 || Socorro || LINEAR || — || align=right | 4.7 km || 
|-id=612 bgcolor=#d6d6d6
| 195612 ||  || — || June 6, 2002 || Socorro || LINEAR || — || align=right | 5.0 km || 
|-id=613 bgcolor=#E9E9E9
| 195613 ||  || — || June 6, 2002 || Socorro || LINEAR || — || align=right | 3.3 km || 
|-id=614 bgcolor=#d6d6d6
| 195614 ||  || — || June 6, 2002 || Socorro || LINEAR || — || align=right | 8.0 km || 
|-id=615 bgcolor=#E9E9E9
| 195615 ||  || — || June 6, 2002 || Socorro || LINEAR || — || align=right | 4.1 km || 
|-id=616 bgcolor=#d6d6d6
| 195616 ||  || — || June 2, 2002 || Palomar || NEAT || — || align=right | 5.7 km || 
|-id=617 bgcolor=#E9E9E9
| 195617 ||  || — || June 5, 2002 || Socorro || LINEAR || — || align=right | 3.2 km || 
|-id=618 bgcolor=#d6d6d6
| 195618 ||  || — || June 8, 2002 || Socorro || LINEAR || — || align=right | 5.4 km || 
|-id=619 bgcolor=#d6d6d6
| 195619 ||  || — || June 12, 2002 || Socorro || LINEAR || — || align=right | 5.2 km || 
|-id=620 bgcolor=#E9E9E9
| 195620 ||  || — || June 10, 2002 || Socorro || LINEAR || — || align=right | 2.4 km || 
|-id=621 bgcolor=#E9E9E9
| 195621 ||  || — || June 4, 2002 || Palomar || NEAT || — || align=right | 1.8 km || 
|-id=622 bgcolor=#E9E9E9
| 195622 ||  || — || June 5, 2002 || Anderson Mesa || LONEOS || — || align=right | 4.4 km || 
|-id=623 bgcolor=#d6d6d6
| 195623 ||  || — || June 11, 2002 || Socorro || LINEAR || — || align=right | 5.6 km || 
|-id=624 bgcolor=#E9E9E9
| 195624 ||  || — || June 8, 2002 || Palomar || NEAT || GEF || align=right | 2.6 km || 
|-id=625 bgcolor=#d6d6d6
| 195625 ||  || — || June 8, 2002 || Palomar || NEAT || LUT || align=right | 7.1 km || 
|-id=626 bgcolor=#E9E9E9
| 195626 ||  || — || June 14, 2002 || Socorro || LINEAR || — || align=right | 5.0 km || 
|-id=627 bgcolor=#E9E9E9
| 195627 ||  || — || June 3, 2002 || Needville || Needville Obs. || RAF || align=right | 1.5 km || 
|-id=628 bgcolor=#d6d6d6
| 195628 ||  || — || June 6, 2002 || Kitt Peak || Spacewatch || — || align=right | 5.2 km || 
|-id=629 bgcolor=#d6d6d6
| 195629 ||  || — || June 16, 2002 || Palomar || NEAT || — || align=right | 3.1 km || 
|-id=630 bgcolor=#d6d6d6
| 195630 ||  || — || July 5, 2002 || Palomar || NEAT || — || align=right | 4.1 km || 
|-id=631 bgcolor=#d6d6d6
| 195631 ||  || — || July 5, 2002 || Palomar || NEAT || — || align=right | 3.3 km || 
|-id=632 bgcolor=#d6d6d6
| 195632 ||  || — || July 8, 2002 || Palomar || NEAT || — || align=right | 4.7 km || 
|-id=633 bgcolor=#d6d6d6
| 195633 ||  || — || July 3, 2002 || Palomar || NEAT || — || align=right | 5.2 km || 
|-id=634 bgcolor=#d6d6d6
| 195634 ||  || — || July 9, 2002 || Campo Imperatore || CINEOS || — || align=right | 4.9 km || 
|-id=635 bgcolor=#E9E9E9
| 195635 ||  || — || July 11, 2002 || Campo Imperatore || CINEOS || — || align=right | 3.6 km || 
|-id=636 bgcolor=#d6d6d6
| 195636 ||  || — || July 12, 2002 || Palomar || NEAT || — || align=right | 4.8 km || 
|-id=637 bgcolor=#d6d6d6
| 195637 ||  || — || July 4, 2002 || Palomar || NEAT || — || align=right | 4.0 km || 
|-id=638 bgcolor=#d6d6d6
| 195638 ||  || — || July 7, 2002 || Palomar || NEAT || ALA || align=right | 5.5 km || 
|-id=639 bgcolor=#d6d6d6
| 195639 ||  || — || July 9, 2002 || Socorro || LINEAR || — || align=right | 6.6 km || 
|-id=640 bgcolor=#d6d6d6
| 195640 ||  || — || July 9, 2002 || Socorro || LINEAR || EUP || align=right | 6.7 km || 
|-id=641 bgcolor=#d6d6d6
| 195641 ||  || — || July 9, 2002 || Socorro || LINEAR || — || align=right | 7.5 km || 
|-id=642 bgcolor=#d6d6d6
| 195642 ||  || — || July 12, 2002 || Palomar || NEAT || EOS || align=right | 6.9 km || 
|-id=643 bgcolor=#d6d6d6
| 195643 ||  || — || July 14, 2002 || Reedy Creek || J. Broughton || — || align=right | 6.4 km || 
|-id=644 bgcolor=#d6d6d6
| 195644 ||  || — || July 14, 2002 || Palomar || NEAT || — || align=right | 4.6 km || 
|-id=645 bgcolor=#d6d6d6
| 195645 ||  || — || July 9, 2002 || Socorro || LINEAR || — || align=right | 5.4 km || 
|-id=646 bgcolor=#d6d6d6
| 195646 ||  || — || July 9, 2002 || Socorro || LINEAR || — || align=right | 6.1 km || 
|-id=647 bgcolor=#d6d6d6
| 195647 ||  || — || July 9, 2002 || Socorro || LINEAR || — || align=right | 3.7 km || 
|-id=648 bgcolor=#d6d6d6
| 195648 ||  || — || July 14, 2002 || Palomar || NEAT || — || align=right | 3.9 km || 
|-id=649 bgcolor=#d6d6d6
| 195649 ||  || — || July 11, 2002 || Campo Imperatore || CINEOS || — || align=right | 3.8 km || 
|-id=650 bgcolor=#d6d6d6
| 195650 ||  || — || July 13, 2002 || Palomar || NEAT || — || align=right | 3.7 km || 
|-id=651 bgcolor=#d6d6d6
| 195651 ||  || — || July 12, 2002 || Palomar || NEAT || — || align=right | 4.4 km || 
|-id=652 bgcolor=#d6d6d6
| 195652 ||  || — || July 12, 2002 || Palomar || NEAT || EOS || align=right | 2.3 km || 
|-id=653 bgcolor=#d6d6d6
| 195653 ||  || — || July 12, 2002 || Palomar || NEAT || — || align=right | 5.9 km || 
|-id=654 bgcolor=#d6d6d6
| 195654 ||  || — || July 14, 2002 || Palomar || NEAT || KOR || align=right | 1.9 km || 
|-id=655 bgcolor=#E9E9E9
| 195655 ||  || — || July 15, 2002 || Palomar || NEAT || — || align=right | 2.3 km || 
|-id=656 bgcolor=#d6d6d6
| 195656 ||  || — || July 9, 2002 || Palomar || NEAT || — || align=right | 3.6 km || 
|-id=657 bgcolor=#d6d6d6
| 195657 Zhuangqining ||  ||  || July 12, 2002 || Palomar || NEAT || EOS || align=right | 2.7 km || 
|-id=658 bgcolor=#d6d6d6
| 195658 ||  || — || July 9, 2002 || Socorro || LINEAR || — || align=right | 4.9 km || 
|-id=659 bgcolor=#d6d6d6
| 195659 ||  || — || July 5, 2002 || Palomar || NEAT || KOR || align=right | 1.9 km || 
|-id=660 bgcolor=#d6d6d6
| 195660 ||  || — || July 9, 2002 || Palomar || NEAT || KOR || align=right | 1.7 km || 
|-id=661 bgcolor=#d6d6d6
| 195661 ||  || — || July 5, 2002 || Palomar || NEAT || — || align=right | 3.1 km || 
|-id=662 bgcolor=#d6d6d6
| 195662 ||  || — || July 8, 2002 || Palomar || NEAT || EOS || align=right | 2.2 km || 
|-id=663 bgcolor=#d6d6d6
| 195663 ||  || — || July 5, 2002 || Palomar || NEAT || — || align=right | 3.7 km || 
|-id=664 bgcolor=#d6d6d6
| 195664 || 2002 OM || — || July 17, 2002 || Socorro || LINEAR || — || align=right | 8.9 km || 
|-id=665 bgcolor=#d6d6d6
| 195665 ||  || — || July 16, 2002 || Haleakala || NEAT || — || align=right | 6.8 km || 
|-id=666 bgcolor=#d6d6d6
| 195666 ||  || — || July 20, 2002 || Palomar || NEAT || LIX || align=right | 4.1 km || 
|-id=667 bgcolor=#d6d6d6
| 195667 ||  || — || July 20, 2002 || Palomar || NEAT || — || align=right | 5.9 km || 
|-id=668 bgcolor=#d6d6d6
| 195668 ||  || — || July 20, 2002 || Palomar || NEAT || — || align=right | 4.6 km || 
|-id=669 bgcolor=#d6d6d6
| 195669 ||  || — || July 21, 2002 || Palomar || NEAT || EOS || align=right | 3.4 km || 
|-id=670 bgcolor=#d6d6d6
| 195670 ||  || — || July 21, 2002 || Palomar || NEAT || — || align=right | 5.2 km || 
|-id=671 bgcolor=#d6d6d6
| 195671 ||  || — || July 18, 2002 || Socorro || LINEAR || — || align=right | 5.6 km || 
|-id=672 bgcolor=#d6d6d6
| 195672 ||  || — || July 18, 2002 || Socorro || LINEAR || — || align=right | 5.2 km || 
|-id=673 bgcolor=#d6d6d6
| 195673 ||  || — || July 18, 2002 || Socorro || LINEAR || — || align=right | 4.2 km || 
|-id=674 bgcolor=#d6d6d6
| 195674 ||  || — || July 22, 2002 || Palomar || NEAT || — || align=right | 4.1 km || 
|-id=675 bgcolor=#d6d6d6
| 195675 ||  || — || July 18, 2002 || Socorro || LINEAR || — || align=right | 6.1 km || 
|-id=676 bgcolor=#d6d6d6
| 195676 ||  || — || July 22, 2002 || Palomar || NEAT || — || align=right | 5.9 km || 
|-id=677 bgcolor=#d6d6d6
| 195677 ||  || — || July 22, 2002 || Palomar || NEAT || EUP || align=right | 7.0 km || 
|-id=678 bgcolor=#d6d6d6
| 195678 ||  || — || July 23, 2002 || Palomar || S. F. Hönig || — || align=right | 5.6 km || 
|-id=679 bgcolor=#d6d6d6
| 195679 ||  || — || July 23, 2002 || Palomar || NEAT || THM || align=right | 3.5 km || 
|-id=680 bgcolor=#d6d6d6
| 195680 ||  || — || July 21, 2002 || Palomar || NEAT || — || align=right | 4.6 km || 
|-id=681 bgcolor=#d6d6d6
| 195681 ||  || — || July 21, 2002 || Palomar || NEAT || — || align=right | 4.2 km || 
|-id=682 bgcolor=#d6d6d6
| 195682 ||  || — || July 21, 2002 || Palomar || NEAT || — || align=right | 5.4 km || 
|-id=683 bgcolor=#d6d6d6
| 195683 ||  || — || July 18, 2002 || Palomar || NEAT || — || align=right | 3.6 km || 
|-id=684 bgcolor=#d6d6d6
| 195684 || 2002 PY || — || August 1, 2002 || Socorro || LINEAR || — || align=right | 8.4 km || 
|-id=685 bgcolor=#d6d6d6
| 195685 ||  || — || August 3, 2002 || Palomar || NEAT || JLI || align=right | 7.1 km || 
|-id=686 bgcolor=#d6d6d6
| 195686 ||  || — || August 4, 2002 || Palomar || NEAT || — || align=right | 6.2 km || 
|-id=687 bgcolor=#d6d6d6
| 195687 ||  || — || August 4, 2002 || Palomar || NEAT || — || align=right | 4.8 km || 
|-id=688 bgcolor=#d6d6d6
| 195688 ||  || — || August 4, 2002 || Palomar || NEAT || EOS || align=right | 3.2 km || 
|-id=689 bgcolor=#d6d6d6
| 195689 ||  || — || August 5, 2002 || Palomar || NEAT || — || align=right | 5.8 km || 
|-id=690 bgcolor=#d6d6d6
| 195690 ||  || — || August 5, 2002 || Palomar || NEAT || — || align=right | 4.2 km || 
|-id=691 bgcolor=#d6d6d6
| 195691 ||  || — || August 5, 2002 || Palomar || NEAT || — || align=right | 6.4 km || 
|-id=692 bgcolor=#d6d6d6
| 195692 ||  || — || August 5, 2002 || Campo Imperatore || CINEOS || — || align=right | 3.4 km || 
|-id=693 bgcolor=#d6d6d6
| 195693 ||  || — || August 5, 2002 || Palomar || NEAT || HYG || align=right | 3.4 km || 
|-id=694 bgcolor=#d6d6d6
| 195694 ||  || — || August 5, 2002 || Palomar || NEAT || EOS || align=right | 3.2 km || 
|-id=695 bgcolor=#d6d6d6
| 195695 ||  || — || August 6, 2002 || Palomar || NEAT || HYG || align=right | 4.4 km || 
|-id=696 bgcolor=#d6d6d6
| 195696 ||  || — || August 6, 2002 || Palomar || NEAT || HYG || align=right | 4.9 km || 
|-id=697 bgcolor=#d6d6d6
| 195697 ||  || — || August 6, 2002 || Palomar || NEAT || VER || align=right | 4.1 km || 
|-id=698 bgcolor=#d6d6d6
| 195698 ||  || — || August 6, 2002 || Palomar || NEAT || HYG || align=right | 6.9 km || 
|-id=699 bgcolor=#d6d6d6
| 195699 ||  || — || August 6, 2002 || Palomar || NEAT || — || align=right | 3.5 km || 
|-id=700 bgcolor=#d6d6d6
| 195700 ||  || — || August 6, 2002 || Palomar || NEAT || EOS || align=right | 3.7 km || 
|}

195701–195800 

|-bgcolor=#d6d6d6
| 195701 ||  || — || August 6, 2002 || Palomar || NEAT || — || align=right | 6.6 km || 
|-id=702 bgcolor=#d6d6d6
| 195702 ||  || — || August 6, 2002 || Palomar || NEAT || — || align=right | 4.9 km || 
|-id=703 bgcolor=#d6d6d6
| 195703 ||  || — || August 6, 2002 || Palomar || NEAT || — || align=right | 4.5 km || 
|-id=704 bgcolor=#d6d6d6
| 195704 ||  || — || August 6, 2002 || Palomar || NEAT || — || align=right | 4.3 km || 
|-id=705 bgcolor=#d6d6d6
| 195705 ||  || — || August 6, 2002 || Palomar || NEAT || — || align=right | 3.3 km || 
|-id=706 bgcolor=#d6d6d6
| 195706 ||  || — || August 6, 2002 || Palomar || NEAT || — || align=right | 3.1 km || 
|-id=707 bgcolor=#d6d6d6
| 195707 ||  || — || August 6, 2002 || Palomar || NEAT || — || align=right | 6.7 km || 
|-id=708 bgcolor=#d6d6d6
| 195708 ||  || — || August 6, 2002 || Palomar || NEAT || HYG || align=right | 3.6 km || 
|-id=709 bgcolor=#d6d6d6
| 195709 ||  || — || August 6, 2002 || Socorro || LINEAR || — || align=right | 6.6 km || 
|-id=710 bgcolor=#d6d6d6
| 195710 ||  || — || August 10, 2002 || Socorro || LINEAR || EOS || align=right | 3.4 km || 
|-id=711 bgcolor=#d6d6d6
| 195711 ||  || — || August 10, 2002 || Socorro || LINEAR || EOS || align=right | 3.6 km || 
|-id=712 bgcolor=#d6d6d6
| 195712 ||  || — || August 10, 2002 || Socorro || LINEAR || EOS || align=right | 4.5 km || 
|-id=713 bgcolor=#d6d6d6
| 195713 ||  || — || August 10, 2002 || Socorro || LINEAR || — || align=right | 6.2 km || 
|-id=714 bgcolor=#d6d6d6
| 195714 ||  || — || August 8, 2002 || Palomar || NEAT || — || align=right | 6.2 km || 
|-id=715 bgcolor=#d6d6d6
| 195715 ||  || — || August 9, 2002 || Socorro || LINEAR || MEL || align=right | 5.8 km || 
|-id=716 bgcolor=#d6d6d6
| 195716 ||  || — || August 9, 2002 || Socorro || LINEAR || — || align=right | 8.6 km || 
|-id=717 bgcolor=#d6d6d6
| 195717 ||  || — || August 9, 2002 || Socorro || LINEAR || — || align=right | 11 km || 
|-id=718 bgcolor=#d6d6d6
| 195718 ||  || — || August 10, 2002 || Socorro || LINEAR || — || align=right | 6.8 km || 
|-id=719 bgcolor=#d6d6d6
| 195719 ||  || — || August 10, 2002 || Socorro || LINEAR || TIR || align=right | 5.8 km || 
|-id=720 bgcolor=#d6d6d6
| 195720 ||  || — || August 11, 2002 || Socorro || LINEAR || — || align=right | 7.4 km || 
|-id=721 bgcolor=#d6d6d6
| 195721 ||  || — || August 11, 2002 || Socorro || LINEAR || — || align=right | 6.0 km || 
|-id=722 bgcolor=#d6d6d6
| 195722 ||  || — || August 8, 2002 || Palomar || NEAT || EOS || align=right | 3.7 km || 
|-id=723 bgcolor=#d6d6d6
| 195723 ||  || — || August 11, 2002 || Socorro || LINEAR || — || align=right | 5.3 km || 
|-id=724 bgcolor=#d6d6d6
| 195724 ||  || — || August 11, 2002 || Socorro || LINEAR || URS || align=right | 5.5 km || 
|-id=725 bgcolor=#d6d6d6
| 195725 ||  || — || August 12, 2002 || Socorro || LINEAR || — || align=right | 3.8 km || 
|-id=726 bgcolor=#d6d6d6
| 195726 ||  || — || August 12, 2002 || Socorro || LINEAR || HYG || align=right | 5.2 km || 
|-id=727 bgcolor=#d6d6d6
| 195727 ||  || — || August 8, 2002 || Palomar || NEAT || — || align=right | 5.0 km || 
|-id=728 bgcolor=#d6d6d6
| 195728 ||  || — || August 8, 2002 || Palomar || NEAT || — || align=right | 3.5 km || 
|-id=729 bgcolor=#d6d6d6
| 195729 ||  || — || August 11, 2002 || Palomar || NEAT || — || align=right | 4.4 km || 
|-id=730 bgcolor=#d6d6d6
| 195730 ||  || — || August 6, 2002 || Kvistaberg || UDAS || — || align=right | 4.9 km || 
|-id=731 bgcolor=#d6d6d6
| 195731 ||  || — || August 9, 2002 || Socorro || LINEAR || — || align=right | 5.4 km || 
|-id=732 bgcolor=#d6d6d6
| 195732 ||  || — || August 12, 2002 || Socorro || LINEAR || — || align=right | 4.0 km || 
|-id=733 bgcolor=#d6d6d6
| 195733 ||  || — || August 11, 2002 || Socorro || LINEAR || URS || align=right | 5.5 km || 
|-id=734 bgcolor=#d6d6d6
| 195734 ||  || — || August 12, 2002 || Haleakala || NEAT || — || align=right | 7.0 km || 
|-id=735 bgcolor=#d6d6d6
| 195735 ||  || — || August 13, 2002 || Socorro || LINEAR || — || align=right | 5.8 km || 
|-id=736 bgcolor=#d6d6d6
| 195736 ||  || — || August 14, 2002 || Palomar || NEAT || — || align=right | 4.5 km || 
|-id=737 bgcolor=#d6d6d6
| 195737 ||  || — || August 14, 2002 || Palomar || NEAT || — || align=right | 6.9 km || 
|-id=738 bgcolor=#d6d6d6
| 195738 ||  || — || August 14, 2002 || Palomar || NEAT || — || align=right | 5.5 km || 
|-id=739 bgcolor=#d6d6d6
| 195739 ||  || — || August 14, 2002 || Palomar || NEAT || — || align=right | 6.1 km || 
|-id=740 bgcolor=#d6d6d6
| 195740 ||  || — || August 14, 2002 || Socorro || LINEAR || EOS || align=right | 3.0 km || 
|-id=741 bgcolor=#d6d6d6
| 195741 ||  || — || August 14, 2002 || Socorro || LINEAR || — || align=right | 4.5 km || 
|-id=742 bgcolor=#d6d6d6
| 195742 ||  || — || August 12, 2002 || Socorro || LINEAR || LIX || align=right | 6.7 km || 
|-id=743 bgcolor=#d6d6d6
| 195743 ||  || — || August 12, 2002 || Socorro || LINEAR || — || align=right | 5.3 km || 
|-id=744 bgcolor=#d6d6d6
| 195744 ||  || — || August 12, 2002 || Socorro || LINEAR || — || align=right | 5.1 km || 
|-id=745 bgcolor=#d6d6d6
| 195745 ||  || — || August 12, 2002 || Socorro || LINEAR || — || align=right | 4.0 km || 
|-id=746 bgcolor=#d6d6d6
| 195746 ||  || — || August 12, 2002 || Socorro || LINEAR || — || align=right | 4.2 km || 
|-id=747 bgcolor=#d6d6d6
| 195747 ||  || — || August 12, 2002 || Socorro || LINEAR || — || align=right | 4.6 km || 
|-id=748 bgcolor=#d6d6d6
| 195748 ||  || — || August 12, 2002 || Socorro || LINEAR || ALA || align=right | 5.5 km || 
|-id=749 bgcolor=#d6d6d6
| 195749 ||  || — || August 12, 2002 || Socorro || LINEAR || — || align=right | 5.4 km || 
|-id=750 bgcolor=#d6d6d6
| 195750 ||  || — || August 12, 2002 || Socorro || LINEAR || URS || align=right | 6.8 km || 
|-id=751 bgcolor=#d6d6d6
| 195751 ||  || — || August 12, 2002 || Socorro || LINEAR || EOS || align=right | 2.9 km || 
|-id=752 bgcolor=#d6d6d6
| 195752 ||  || — || August 12, 2002 || Socorro || LINEAR || — || align=right | 5.7 km || 
|-id=753 bgcolor=#d6d6d6
| 195753 ||  || — || August 12, 2002 || Socorro || LINEAR || — || align=right | 4.4 km || 
|-id=754 bgcolor=#d6d6d6
| 195754 ||  || — || August 12, 2002 || Socorro || LINEAR || TEL || align=right | 2.0 km || 
|-id=755 bgcolor=#d6d6d6
| 195755 ||  || — || August 12, 2002 || Socorro || LINEAR || EOS || align=right | 3.6 km || 
|-id=756 bgcolor=#d6d6d6
| 195756 ||  || — || August 12, 2002 || Socorro || LINEAR || VER || align=right | 4.9 km || 
|-id=757 bgcolor=#d6d6d6
| 195757 ||  || — || August 12, 2002 || Socorro || LINEAR || — || align=right | 5.3 km || 
|-id=758 bgcolor=#d6d6d6
| 195758 ||  || — || August 12, 2002 || Socorro || LINEAR || VER || align=right | 4.0 km || 
|-id=759 bgcolor=#d6d6d6
| 195759 ||  || — || August 12, 2002 || Socorro || LINEAR || EOS || align=right | 3.1 km || 
|-id=760 bgcolor=#d6d6d6
| 195760 ||  || — || August 13, 2002 || Palomar || NEAT || EOS || align=right | 3.2 km || 
|-id=761 bgcolor=#d6d6d6
| 195761 ||  || — || August 14, 2002 || Socorro || LINEAR || — || align=right | 4.9 km || 
|-id=762 bgcolor=#d6d6d6
| 195762 ||  || — || August 13, 2002 || Palomar || NEAT || — || align=right | 4.3 km || 
|-id=763 bgcolor=#d6d6d6
| 195763 ||  || — || August 13, 2002 || Anderson Mesa || LONEOS || — || align=right | 4.4 km || 
|-id=764 bgcolor=#d6d6d6
| 195764 ||  || — || August 13, 2002 || Anderson Mesa || LONEOS || — || align=right | 4.7 km || 
|-id=765 bgcolor=#d6d6d6
| 195765 ||  || — || August 13, 2002 || Anderson Mesa || LONEOS || — || align=right | 7.7 km || 
|-id=766 bgcolor=#E9E9E9
| 195766 ||  || — || August 14, 2002 || Anderson Mesa || LONEOS || — || align=right | 5.5 km || 
|-id=767 bgcolor=#d6d6d6
| 195767 ||  || — || August 14, 2002 || Socorro || LINEAR || — || align=right | 5.2 km || 
|-id=768 bgcolor=#d6d6d6
| 195768 ||  || — || August 14, 2002 || Socorro || LINEAR || — || align=right | 6.8 km || 
|-id=769 bgcolor=#d6d6d6
| 195769 ||  || — || August 14, 2002 || Socorro || LINEAR || HYG || align=right | 5.1 km || 
|-id=770 bgcolor=#d6d6d6
| 195770 ||  || — || August 14, 2002 || Socorro || LINEAR || — || align=right | 5.1 km || 
|-id=771 bgcolor=#d6d6d6
| 195771 ||  || — || August 14, 2002 || Palomar || NEAT || — || align=right | 7.8 km || 
|-id=772 bgcolor=#d6d6d6
| 195772 ||  || — || August 14, 2002 || Socorro || LINEAR || EOS || align=right | 3.2 km || 
|-id=773 bgcolor=#d6d6d6
| 195773 ||  || — || August 14, 2002 || Socorro || LINEAR || — || align=right | 3.7 km || 
|-id=774 bgcolor=#d6d6d6
| 195774 ||  || — || August 15, 2002 || Anderson Mesa || LONEOS || HYG || align=right | 4.2 km || 
|-id=775 bgcolor=#d6d6d6
| 195775 ||  || — || August 4, 2002 || Socorro || LINEAR || — || align=right | 7.7 km || 
|-id=776 bgcolor=#d6d6d6
| 195776 ||  || — || August 8, 2002 || Palomar || NEAT || — || align=right | 4.8 km || 
|-id=777 bgcolor=#d6d6d6
| 195777 Sheepman ||  ||  || August 12, 2002 || Cerro Tololo || E. Chiang, M. W. Buie || TEL || align=right | 2.5 km || 
|-id=778 bgcolor=#d6d6d6
| 195778 ||  || — || August 8, 2002 || Palomar || S. F. Hönig || — || align=right | 3.7 km || 
|-id=779 bgcolor=#d6d6d6
| 195779 ||  || — || August 8, 2002 || Palomar || S. F. Hönig || EOS || align=right | 2.9 km || 
|-id=780 bgcolor=#d6d6d6
| 195780 ||  || — || August 8, 2002 || Palomar || S. F. Hönig || KOR || align=right | 2.2 km || 
|-id=781 bgcolor=#d6d6d6
| 195781 ||  || — || August 8, 2002 || Palomar || S. F. Hönig || — || align=right | 3.1 km || 
|-id=782 bgcolor=#d6d6d6
| 195782 ||  || — || August 8, 2002 || Palomar || S. F. Hönig || — || align=right | 4.2 km || 
|-id=783 bgcolor=#d6d6d6
| 195783 ||  || — || August 8, 2002 || Palomar || S. F. Hönig || — || align=right | 2.4 km || 
|-id=784 bgcolor=#d6d6d6
| 195784 ||  || — || August 8, 2002 || Palomar || S. F. Hönig || — || align=right | 4.1 km || 
|-id=785 bgcolor=#d6d6d6
| 195785 ||  || — || August 8, 2002 || Palomar || S. F. Hönig || — || align=right | 5.7 km || 
|-id=786 bgcolor=#d6d6d6
| 195786 ||  || — || August 15, 2002 || Palomar || NEAT || — || align=right | 5.1 km || 
|-id=787 bgcolor=#d6d6d6
| 195787 ||  || — || August 8, 2002 || Palomar || NEAT || THM || align=right | 2.9 km || 
|-id=788 bgcolor=#d6d6d6
| 195788 ||  || — || August 8, 2002 || Palomar || NEAT || — || align=right | 3.3 km || 
|-id=789 bgcolor=#d6d6d6
| 195789 ||  || — || August 7, 2002 || Palomar || NEAT || — || align=right | 3.4 km || 
|-id=790 bgcolor=#d6d6d6
| 195790 ||  || — || August 8, 2002 || Palomar || NEAT || — || align=right | 3.6 km || 
|-id=791 bgcolor=#d6d6d6
| 195791 ||  || — || August 11, 2002 || Palomar || NEAT || KOR || align=right | 1.8 km || 
|-id=792 bgcolor=#d6d6d6
| 195792 ||  || — || August 7, 2002 || Palomar || NEAT || — || align=right | 3.2 km || 
|-id=793 bgcolor=#d6d6d6
| 195793 ||  || — || August 8, 2002 || Palomar || NEAT || KOR || align=right | 2.2 km || 
|-id=794 bgcolor=#d6d6d6
| 195794 ||  || — || August 15, 2002 || Palomar || NEAT || — || align=right | 4.9 km || 
|-id=795 bgcolor=#d6d6d6
| 195795 ||  || — || August 16, 2002 || Palomar || NEAT || HYG || align=right | 4.0 km || 
|-id=796 bgcolor=#d6d6d6
| 195796 ||  || — || August 16, 2002 || Palomar || NEAT || EOS || align=right | 3.2 km || 
|-id=797 bgcolor=#d6d6d6
| 195797 ||  || — || August 16, 2002 || Palomar || NEAT || — || align=right | 4.5 km || 
|-id=798 bgcolor=#d6d6d6
| 195798 ||  || — || August 16, 2002 || Haleakala || NEAT || — || align=right | 3.9 km || 
|-id=799 bgcolor=#E9E9E9
| 195799 ||  || — || August 19, 2002 || Palomar || NEAT || — || align=right | 4.2 km || 
|-id=800 bgcolor=#d6d6d6
| 195800 ||  || — || August 19, 2002 || Palomar || NEAT || — || align=right | 4.5 km || 
|}

195801–195900 

|-bgcolor=#d6d6d6
| 195801 ||  || — || August 19, 2002 || Palomar || NEAT || TIR || align=right | 5.5 km || 
|-id=802 bgcolor=#d6d6d6
| 195802 ||  || — || August 19, 2002 || Palomar || NEAT || URS || align=right | 7.4 km || 
|-id=803 bgcolor=#d6d6d6
| 195803 ||  || — || August 24, 2002 || Palomar || NEAT || EUP || align=right | 5.4 km || 
|-id=804 bgcolor=#d6d6d6
| 195804 ||  || — || August 26, 2002 || Palomar || NEAT || — || align=right | 5.9 km || 
|-id=805 bgcolor=#d6d6d6
| 195805 ||  || — || August 26, 2002 || Palomar || NEAT || VER || align=right | 6.0 km || 
|-id=806 bgcolor=#d6d6d6
| 195806 ||  || — || August 26, 2002 || Palomar || NEAT || — || align=right | 4.2 km || 
|-id=807 bgcolor=#FA8072
| 195807 ||  || — || August 24, 2002 || Palomar || NEAT || — || align=right data-sort-value="0.56" | 560 m || 
|-id=808 bgcolor=#d6d6d6
| 195808 ||  || — || August 27, 2002 || Palomar || NEAT || EOS || align=right | 3.1 km || 
|-id=809 bgcolor=#d6d6d6
| 195809 ||  || — || August 28, 2002 || Palomar || NEAT || — || align=right | 6.5 km || 
|-id=810 bgcolor=#d6d6d6
| 195810 ||  || — || August 26, 2002 || Palomar || NEAT || — || align=right | 3.8 km || 
|-id=811 bgcolor=#d6d6d6
| 195811 ||  || — || August 26, 2002 || Palomar || NEAT || — || align=right | 4.6 km || 
|-id=812 bgcolor=#d6d6d6
| 195812 ||  || — || August 26, 2002 || Palomar || NEAT || ANF || align=right | 3.2 km || 
|-id=813 bgcolor=#d6d6d6
| 195813 ||  || — || August 28, 2002 || Palomar || NEAT || — || align=right | 4.6 km || 
|-id=814 bgcolor=#d6d6d6
| 195814 ||  || — || August 28, 2002 || Palomar || NEAT || — || align=right | 5.7 km || 
|-id=815 bgcolor=#d6d6d6
| 195815 ||  || — || August 28, 2002 || Palomar || NEAT || — || align=right | 4.8 km || 
|-id=816 bgcolor=#d6d6d6
| 195816 ||  || — || August 26, 2002 || Palomar || NEAT || THM || align=right | 3.6 km || 
|-id=817 bgcolor=#d6d6d6
| 195817 ||  || — || August 27, 2002 || Palomar || NEAT || — || align=right | 4.1 km || 
|-id=818 bgcolor=#d6d6d6
| 195818 ||  || — || August 28, 2002 || Palomar || NEAT || — || align=right | 5.1 km || 
|-id=819 bgcolor=#d6d6d6
| 195819 ||  || — || August 29, 2002 || Palomar || NEAT || THM || align=right | 3.4 km || 
|-id=820 bgcolor=#d6d6d6
| 195820 ||  || — || August 29, 2002 || Palomar || NEAT || — || align=right | 4.2 km || 
|-id=821 bgcolor=#d6d6d6
| 195821 ||  || — || August 29, 2002 || Palomar || NEAT || — || align=right | 3.9 km || 
|-id=822 bgcolor=#d6d6d6
| 195822 ||  || — || August 30, 2002 || Kitt Peak || Spacewatch || THM || align=right | 4.1 km || 
|-id=823 bgcolor=#d6d6d6
| 195823 ||  || — || August 30, 2002 || Kitt Peak || Spacewatch || URS || align=right | 5.7 km || 
|-id=824 bgcolor=#d6d6d6
| 195824 ||  || — || August 30, 2002 || Kitt Peak || Spacewatch || — || align=right | 3.3 km || 
|-id=825 bgcolor=#d6d6d6
| 195825 ||  || — || August 30, 2002 || Palomar || NEAT || HYG || align=right | 5.3 km || 
|-id=826 bgcolor=#d6d6d6
| 195826 ||  || — || August 31, 2002 || Anderson Mesa || LONEOS || — || align=right | 5.8 km || 
|-id=827 bgcolor=#d6d6d6
| 195827 ||  || — || August 27, 2002 || Palomar || S. F. Hönig || — || align=right | 3.5 km || 
|-id=828 bgcolor=#d6d6d6
| 195828 ||  || — || August 29, 2002 || Palomar || S. F. Hönig || — || align=right | 4.0 km || 
|-id=829 bgcolor=#d6d6d6
| 195829 ||  || — || August 29, 2002 || Palomar || S. F. Hönig || — || align=right | 6.4 km || 
|-id=830 bgcolor=#d6d6d6
| 195830 ||  || — || August 18, 2002 || Palomar || A. Lowe || THM || align=right | 3.1 km || 
|-id=831 bgcolor=#d6d6d6
| 195831 ||  || — || August 19, 2002 || Palomar || NEAT || EOS || align=right | 2.6 km || 
|-id=832 bgcolor=#d6d6d6
| 195832 ||  || — || August 16, 2002 || Palomar || NEAT || — || align=right | 3.8 km || 
|-id=833 bgcolor=#d6d6d6
| 195833 ||  || — || August 27, 2002 || Palomar || NEAT || — || align=right | 3.5 km || 
|-id=834 bgcolor=#d6d6d6
| 195834 ||  || — || August 18, 2002 || Palomar || NEAT || — || align=right | 3.4 km || 
|-id=835 bgcolor=#d6d6d6
| 195835 ||  || — || August 18, 2002 || Palomar || NEAT || — || align=right | 3.6 km || 
|-id=836 bgcolor=#d6d6d6
| 195836 ||  || — || August 18, 2002 || Palomar || NEAT || — || align=right | 2.8 km || 
|-id=837 bgcolor=#d6d6d6
| 195837 ||  || — || August 17, 2002 || Palomar || NEAT || — || align=right | 2.8 km || 
|-id=838 bgcolor=#d6d6d6
| 195838 ||  || — || August 29, 2002 || Palomar || NEAT || 7:4 || align=right | 4.4 km || 
|-id=839 bgcolor=#d6d6d6
| 195839 ||  || — || August 18, 2002 || Palomar || NEAT || THM || align=right | 3.1 km || 
|-id=840 bgcolor=#d6d6d6
| 195840 ||  || — || August 28, 2002 || Palomar || NEAT || EMA || align=right | 5.1 km || 
|-id=841 bgcolor=#d6d6d6
| 195841 ||  || — || August 29, 2002 || Palomar || NEAT || — || align=right | 3.0 km || 
|-id=842 bgcolor=#d6d6d6
| 195842 ||  || — || August 30, 2002 || Palomar || NEAT || EOS || align=right | 2.5 km || 
|-id=843 bgcolor=#d6d6d6
| 195843 ||  || — || August 19, 2002 || Palomar || NEAT || — || align=right | 6.1 km || 
|-id=844 bgcolor=#d6d6d6
| 195844 ||  || — || August 28, 2002 || Palomar || NEAT || — || align=right | 4.0 km || 
|-id=845 bgcolor=#d6d6d6
| 195845 ||  || — || August 18, 2002 || Palomar || NEAT || — || align=right | 3.2 km || 
|-id=846 bgcolor=#d6d6d6
| 195846 ||  || — || August 28, 2002 || Palomar || NEAT || EOS || align=right | 2.3 km || 
|-id=847 bgcolor=#d6d6d6
| 195847 ||  || — || August 18, 2002 || Palomar || NEAT || — || align=right | 3.9 km || 
|-id=848 bgcolor=#d6d6d6
| 195848 ||  || — || August 29, 2002 || Palomar || NEAT || — || align=right | 3.2 km || 
|-id=849 bgcolor=#d6d6d6
| 195849 ||  || — || August 16, 2002 || Haleakala || NEAT || URS || align=right | 5.0 km || 
|-id=850 bgcolor=#d6d6d6
| 195850 ||  || — || August 17, 2002 || Palomar || NEAT || THM || align=right | 2.9 km || 
|-id=851 bgcolor=#d6d6d6
| 195851 ||  || — || August 16, 2002 || Palomar || NEAT || — || align=right | 4.1 km || 
|-id=852 bgcolor=#d6d6d6
| 195852 ||  || — || August 16, 2002 || Palomar || NEAT || — || align=right | 3.9 km || 
|-id=853 bgcolor=#d6d6d6
| 195853 ||  || — || August 18, 2002 || Palomar || NEAT || HYG || align=right | 3.6 km || 
|-id=854 bgcolor=#d6d6d6
| 195854 ||  || — || August 30, 2002 || Palomar || NEAT || — || align=right | 3.9 km || 
|-id=855 bgcolor=#d6d6d6
| 195855 ||  || — || August 19, 2002 || Palomar || NEAT || HYG || align=right | 3.3 km || 
|-id=856 bgcolor=#d6d6d6
| 195856 ||  || — || August 16, 2002 || Palomar || NEAT || — || align=right | 2.8 km || 
|-id=857 bgcolor=#d6d6d6
| 195857 ||  || — || August 17, 2002 || Palomar || NEAT || — || align=right | 3.1 km || 
|-id=858 bgcolor=#d6d6d6
| 195858 ||  || — || August 16, 2002 || Palomar || NEAT || — || align=right | 3.3 km || 
|-id=859 bgcolor=#d6d6d6
| 195859 ||  || — || August 30, 2002 || Palomar || NEAT || — || align=right | 3.0 km || 
|-id=860 bgcolor=#d6d6d6
| 195860 ||  || — || August 17, 2002 || Palomar || NEAT || — || align=right | 4.8 km || 
|-id=861 bgcolor=#d6d6d6
| 195861 ||  || — || August 19, 2002 || Palomar || NEAT || TEL || align=right | 2.4 km || 
|-id=862 bgcolor=#d6d6d6
| 195862 ||  || — || August 30, 2002 || Palomar || NEAT || — || align=right | 4.7 km || 
|-id=863 bgcolor=#d6d6d6
| 195863 ||  || — || August 30, 2002 || Palomar || NEAT || — || align=right | 4.8 km || 
|-id=864 bgcolor=#d6d6d6
| 195864 ||  || — || August 29, 2002 || Palomar || NEAT || — || align=right | 3.1 km || 
|-id=865 bgcolor=#d6d6d6
| 195865 ||  || — || August 16, 2002 || Palomar || NEAT || — || align=right | 3.0 km || 
|-id=866 bgcolor=#d6d6d6
| 195866 ||  || — || August 18, 2002 || Palomar || NEAT || KOR || align=right | 1.8 km || 
|-id=867 bgcolor=#d6d6d6
| 195867 ||  || — || August 18, 2002 || Palomar || NEAT || EOS || align=right | 2.2 km || 
|-id=868 bgcolor=#d6d6d6
| 195868 ||  || — || August 26, 2002 || Palomar || NEAT || URS || align=right | 4.7 km || 
|-id=869 bgcolor=#d6d6d6
| 195869 ||  || — || August 20, 2002 || Palomar || NEAT || — || align=right | 4.2 km || 
|-id=870 bgcolor=#d6d6d6
| 195870 ||  || — || August 16, 2002 || Palomar || NEAT || HYG || align=right | 3.1 km || 
|-id=871 bgcolor=#d6d6d6
| 195871 ||  || — || August 27, 2002 || Palomar || NEAT || — || align=right | 2.9 km || 
|-id=872 bgcolor=#d6d6d6
| 195872 ||  || — || August 18, 2002 || Palomar || NEAT || — || align=right | 2.9 km || 
|-id=873 bgcolor=#d6d6d6
| 195873 || 2002 RD || — || September 1, 2002 || Palomar || NEAT || — || align=right | 5.9 km || 
|-id=874 bgcolor=#d6d6d6
| 195874 ||  || — || September 3, 2002 || Emerald Lane || L. Ball || — || align=right | 5.4 km || 
|-id=875 bgcolor=#d6d6d6
| 195875 ||  || — || September 1, 2002 || Haleakala || NEAT || EUP || align=right | 6.7 km || 
|-id=876 bgcolor=#d6d6d6
| 195876 ||  || — || September 1, 2002 || Haleakala || NEAT || EOS || align=right | 3.4 km || 
|-id=877 bgcolor=#d6d6d6
| 195877 ||  || — || September 1, 2002 || Haleakala || NEAT || EOS || align=right | 3.4 km || 
|-id=878 bgcolor=#d6d6d6
| 195878 ||  || — || September 1, 2002 || Haleakala || NEAT || — || align=right | 3.8 km || 
|-id=879 bgcolor=#d6d6d6
| 195879 ||  || — || September 3, 2002 || Haleakala || NEAT || HYG || align=right | 5.1 km || 
|-id=880 bgcolor=#d6d6d6
| 195880 ||  || — || September 4, 2002 || Palomar || NEAT || — || align=right | 4.6 km || 
|-id=881 bgcolor=#d6d6d6
| 195881 ||  || — || September 4, 2002 || Anderson Mesa || LONEOS || — || align=right | 5.5 km || 
|-id=882 bgcolor=#d6d6d6
| 195882 ||  || — || September 4, 2002 || Anderson Mesa || LONEOS || THM || align=right | 3.5 km || 
|-id=883 bgcolor=#d6d6d6
| 195883 ||  || — || September 4, 2002 || Anderson Mesa || LONEOS || — || align=right | 3.9 km || 
|-id=884 bgcolor=#d6d6d6
| 195884 ||  || — || September 4, 2002 || Anderson Mesa || LONEOS || — || align=right | 6.0 km || 
|-id=885 bgcolor=#d6d6d6
| 195885 ||  || — || September 4, 2002 || Anderson Mesa || LONEOS || — || align=right | 5.9 km || 
|-id=886 bgcolor=#d6d6d6
| 195886 ||  || — || September 4, 2002 || Anderson Mesa || LONEOS || — || align=right | 6.7 km || 
|-id=887 bgcolor=#d6d6d6
| 195887 ||  || — || September 4, 2002 || Anderson Mesa || LONEOS || — || align=right | 4.4 km || 
|-id=888 bgcolor=#d6d6d6
| 195888 ||  || — || September 4, 2002 || Anderson Mesa || LONEOS || LIX || align=right | 7.9 km || 
|-id=889 bgcolor=#d6d6d6
| 195889 ||  || — || September 4, 2002 || Anderson Mesa || LONEOS || EOS || align=right | 3.2 km || 
|-id=890 bgcolor=#d6d6d6
| 195890 ||  || — || September 4, 2002 || Anderson Mesa || LONEOS || TIR || align=right | 5.6 km || 
|-id=891 bgcolor=#d6d6d6
| 195891 ||  || — || September 4, 2002 || Anderson Mesa || LONEOS || — || align=right | 5.0 km || 
|-id=892 bgcolor=#d6d6d6
| 195892 ||  || — || September 4, 2002 || Anderson Mesa || LONEOS || — || align=right | 5.4 km || 
|-id=893 bgcolor=#d6d6d6
| 195893 ||  || — || September 4, 2002 || Anderson Mesa || LONEOS || — || align=right | 5.6 km || 
|-id=894 bgcolor=#d6d6d6
| 195894 ||  || — || September 4, 2002 || Anderson Mesa || LONEOS || — || align=right | 5.3 km || 
|-id=895 bgcolor=#d6d6d6
| 195895 ||  || — || September 4, 2002 || Anderson Mesa || LONEOS || — || align=right | 7.6 km || 
|-id=896 bgcolor=#E9E9E9
| 195896 ||  || — || September 4, 2002 || Anderson Mesa || LONEOS || — || align=right | 3.7 km || 
|-id=897 bgcolor=#d6d6d6
| 195897 ||  || — || September 5, 2002 || Anderson Mesa || LONEOS || — || align=right | 6.6 km || 
|-id=898 bgcolor=#d6d6d6
| 195898 ||  || — || September 5, 2002 || Socorro || LINEAR || — || align=right | 4.2 km || 
|-id=899 bgcolor=#d6d6d6
| 195899 ||  || — || September 5, 2002 || Socorro || LINEAR || THB || align=right | 5.0 km || 
|-id=900 bgcolor=#d6d6d6
| 195900 Rogersudbury ||  ||  || September 5, 2002 || Socorro || LINEAR || — || align=right | 6.0 km || 
|}

195901–196000 

|-bgcolor=#d6d6d6
| 195901 ||  || — || September 5, 2002 || Socorro || LINEAR || EOS || align=right | 3.3 km || 
|-id=902 bgcolor=#d6d6d6
| 195902 ||  || — || September 5, 2002 || Socorro || LINEAR || THM || align=right | 4.0 km || 
|-id=903 bgcolor=#d6d6d6
| 195903 ||  || — || September 5, 2002 || Socorro || LINEAR || — || align=right | 3.8 km || 
|-id=904 bgcolor=#d6d6d6
| 195904 ||  || — || September 5, 2002 || Socorro || LINEAR || — || align=right | 4.5 km || 
|-id=905 bgcolor=#d6d6d6
| 195905 ||  || — || September 5, 2002 || Anderson Mesa || LONEOS || — || align=right | 5.9 km || 
|-id=906 bgcolor=#d6d6d6
| 195906 ||  || — || September 5, 2002 || Anderson Mesa || LONEOS || ALA || align=right | 7.3 km || 
|-id=907 bgcolor=#d6d6d6
| 195907 ||  || — || September 5, 2002 || Socorro || LINEAR || TIR || align=right | 5.8 km || 
|-id=908 bgcolor=#d6d6d6
| 195908 ||  || — || September 5, 2002 || Anderson Mesa || LONEOS || — || align=right | 5.9 km || 
|-id=909 bgcolor=#d6d6d6
| 195909 ||  || — || September 4, 2002 || Palomar || NEAT || TEL || align=right | 2.6 km || 
|-id=910 bgcolor=#d6d6d6
| 195910 ||  || — || September 4, 2002 || Palomar || NEAT || EOS || align=right | 3.8 km || 
|-id=911 bgcolor=#d6d6d6
| 195911 ||  || — || September 4, 2002 || Palomar || NEAT || EOS || align=right | 4.3 km || 
|-id=912 bgcolor=#d6d6d6
| 195912 ||  || — || September 4, 2002 || Palomar || NEAT || EMA || align=right | 4.7 km || 
|-id=913 bgcolor=#d6d6d6
| 195913 ||  || — || September 5, 2002 || Socorro || LINEAR || VER || align=right | 4.6 km || 
|-id=914 bgcolor=#d6d6d6
| 195914 ||  || — || September 5, 2002 || Socorro || LINEAR || — || align=right | 4.0 km || 
|-id=915 bgcolor=#d6d6d6
| 195915 ||  || — || September 5, 2002 || Socorro || LINEAR || — || align=right | 6.0 km || 
|-id=916 bgcolor=#d6d6d6
| 195916 ||  || — || September 5, 2002 || Socorro || LINEAR || — || align=right | 6.6 km || 
|-id=917 bgcolor=#d6d6d6
| 195917 ||  || — || September 5, 2002 || Socorro || LINEAR || — || align=right | 5.9 km || 
|-id=918 bgcolor=#d6d6d6
| 195918 ||  || — || September 5, 2002 || Socorro || LINEAR || EOS || align=right | 3.4 km || 
|-id=919 bgcolor=#d6d6d6
| 195919 ||  || — || September 5, 2002 || Socorro || LINEAR || — || align=right | 5.3 km || 
|-id=920 bgcolor=#d6d6d6
| 195920 ||  || — || September 5, 2002 || Socorro || LINEAR || — || align=right | 6.2 km || 
|-id=921 bgcolor=#d6d6d6
| 195921 ||  || — || September 5, 2002 || Socorro || LINEAR || TIR || align=right | 4.5 km || 
|-id=922 bgcolor=#d6d6d6
| 195922 ||  || — || September 5, 2002 || Socorro || LINEAR || — || align=right | 3.5 km || 
|-id=923 bgcolor=#d6d6d6
| 195923 ||  || — || September 5, 2002 || Socorro || LINEAR || — || align=right | 3.7 km || 
|-id=924 bgcolor=#d6d6d6
| 195924 ||  || — || September 5, 2002 || Socorro || LINEAR || — || align=right | 4.9 km || 
|-id=925 bgcolor=#d6d6d6
| 195925 ||  || — || September 5, 2002 || Socorro || LINEAR || — || align=right | 6.2 km || 
|-id=926 bgcolor=#d6d6d6
| 195926 ||  || — || September 5, 2002 || Socorro || LINEAR || — || align=right | 4.3 km || 
|-id=927 bgcolor=#d6d6d6
| 195927 ||  || — || September 6, 2002 || Socorro || LINEAR || HYG || align=right | 4.4 km || 
|-id=928 bgcolor=#d6d6d6
| 195928 ||  || — || September 6, 2002 || Socorro || LINEAR || — || align=right | 5.9 km || 
|-id=929 bgcolor=#d6d6d6
| 195929 ||  || — || September 6, 2002 || Socorro || LINEAR || EOS || align=right | 4.1 km || 
|-id=930 bgcolor=#d6d6d6
| 195930 ||  || — || September 5, 2002 || Socorro || LINEAR || — || align=right | 7.8 km || 
|-id=931 bgcolor=#d6d6d6
| 195931 ||  || — || September 6, 2002 || Socorro || LINEAR || HYG || align=right | 4.8 km || 
|-id=932 bgcolor=#d6d6d6
| 195932 ||  || — || September 7, 2002 || Socorro || LINEAR || URS || align=right | 5.7 km || 
|-id=933 bgcolor=#E9E9E9
| 195933 ||  || — || September 6, 2002 || Socorro || LINEAR || AGN || align=right | 2.2 km || 
|-id=934 bgcolor=#d6d6d6
| 195934 ||  || — || September 8, 2002 || Haleakala || NEAT || — || align=right | 8.5 km || 
|-id=935 bgcolor=#d6d6d6
| 195935 ||  || — || September 8, 2002 || Haleakala || NEAT || — || align=right | 3.7 km || 
|-id=936 bgcolor=#d6d6d6
| 195936 ||  || — || September 9, 2002 || Campo Imperatore || CINEOS || — || align=right | 5.1 km || 
|-id=937 bgcolor=#d6d6d6
| 195937 ||  || — || September 10, 2002 || Palomar || NEAT || URS || align=right | 8.2 km || 
|-id=938 bgcolor=#d6d6d6
| 195938 ||  || — || September 10, 2002 || Palomar || NEAT || THB || align=right | 4.8 km || 
|-id=939 bgcolor=#d6d6d6
| 195939 ||  || — || September 10, 2002 || Palomar || NEAT || ALA || align=right | 5.0 km || 
|-id=940 bgcolor=#d6d6d6
| 195940 ||  || — || September 10, 2002 || Palomar || NEAT || URS || align=right | 6.9 km || 
|-id=941 bgcolor=#d6d6d6
| 195941 ||  || — || September 11, 2002 || Palomar || NEAT || EOS || align=right | 5.2 km || 
|-id=942 bgcolor=#d6d6d6
| 195942 ||  || — || September 11, 2002 || Palomar || NEAT || — || align=right | 6.4 km || 
|-id=943 bgcolor=#d6d6d6
| 195943 ||  || — || September 10, 2002 || Palomar || NEAT || TIR || align=right | 8.3 km || 
|-id=944 bgcolor=#d6d6d6
| 195944 ||  || — || September 10, 2002 || Palomar || NEAT || THB || align=right | 7.2 km || 
|-id=945 bgcolor=#d6d6d6
| 195945 ||  || — || September 11, 2002 || Haleakala || NEAT || URS || align=right | 4.9 km || 
|-id=946 bgcolor=#d6d6d6
| 195946 ||  || — || September 13, 2002 || Michael Adrian || M. Kretlow || — || align=right | 3.7 km || 
|-id=947 bgcolor=#d6d6d6
| 195947 ||  || — || September 10, 2002 || Palomar || NEAT || THB || align=right | 5.6 km || 
|-id=948 bgcolor=#d6d6d6
| 195948 ||  || — || September 11, 2002 || Palomar || NEAT || — || align=right | 3.6 km || 
|-id=949 bgcolor=#d6d6d6
| 195949 ||  || — || September 11, 2002 || Palomar || NEAT || TIR || align=right | 2.9 km || 
|-id=950 bgcolor=#d6d6d6
| 195950 ||  || — || September 11, 2002 || Haleakala || NEAT || HYG || align=right | 3.8 km || 
|-id=951 bgcolor=#d6d6d6
| 195951 ||  || — || September 12, 2002 || Palomar || NEAT || — || align=right | 3.5 km || 
|-id=952 bgcolor=#d6d6d6
| 195952 ||  || — || September 12, 2002 || Palomar || NEAT || URS || align=right | 4.5 km || 
|-id=953 bgcolor=#d6d6d6
| 195953 ||  || — || September 11, 2002 || Palomar || NEAT || — || align=right | 4.6 km || 
|-id=954 bgcolor=#d6d6d6
| 195954 ||  || — || September 12, 2002 || Palomar || NEAT || HYG || align=right | 3.6 km || 
|-id=955 bgcolor=#d6d6d6
| 195955 ||  || — || September 12, 2002 || Palomar || NEAT || HYG || align=right | 4.1 km || 
|-id=956 bgcolor=#d6d6d6
| 195956 ||  || — || September 12, 2002 || Palomar || NEAT || — || align=right | 3.7 km || 
|-id=957 bgcolor=#d6d6d6
| 195957 ||  || — || September 13, 2002 || Palomar || NEAT || EMAslow || align=right | 6.7 km || 
|-id=958 bgcolor=#d6d6d6
| 195958 ||  || — || September 13, 2002 || Palomar || NEAT || — || align=right | 4.7 km || 
|-id=959 bgcolor=#d6d6d6
| 195959 ||  || — || September 13, 2002 || Palomar || NEAT || — || align=right | 3.7 km || 
|-id=960 bgcolor=#d6d6d6
| 195960 ||  || — || September 13, 2002 || Palomar || NEAT || EOS || align=right | 3.1 km || 
|-id=961 bgcolor=#d6d6d6
| 195961 ||  || — || September 13, 2002 || Palomar || NEAT || — || align=right | 4.1 km || 
|-id=962 bgcolor=#d6d6d6
| 195962 ||  || — || September 13, 2002 || Anderson Mesa || LONEOS || — || align=right | 7.4 km || 
|-id=963 bgcolor=#d6d6d6
| 195963 ||  || — || September 13, 2002 || Palomar || NEAT || — || align=right | 7.1 km || 
|-id=964 bgcolor=#d6d6d6
| 195964 ||  || — || September 13, 2002 || Palomar || NEAT || — || align=right | 4.5 km || 
|-id=965 bgcolor=#d6d6d6
| 195965 ||  || — || September 13, 2002 || Palomar || NEAT || — || align=right | 4.9 km || 
|-id=966 bgcolor=#d6d6d6
| 195966 ||  || — || September 13, 2002 || Palomar || NEAT || EOS || align=right | 2.5 km || 
|-id=967 bgcolor=#d6d6d6
| 195967 ||  || — || September 13, 2002 || Palomar || NEAT || MEL || align=right | 7.1 km || 
|-id=968 bgcolor=#d6d6d6
| 195968 ||  || — || September 13, 2002 || Palomar || NEAT || — || align=right | 4.0 km || 
|-id=969 bgcolor=#d6d6d6
| 195969 ||  || — || September 14, 2002 || Kitt Peak || Spacewatch || THM || align=right | 2.7 km || 
|-id=970 bgcolor=#d6d6d6
| 195970 ||  || — || September 12, 2002 || Palomar || NEAT || EOS || align=right | 4.0 km || 
|-id=971 bgcolor=#d6d6d6
| 195971 ||  || — || September 12, 2002 || Palomar || NEAT || — || align=right | 4.1 km || 
|-id=972 bgcolor=#d6d6d6
| 195972 ||  || — || September 12, 2002 || Palomar || NEAT || URS || align=right | 6.1 km || 
|-id=973 bgcolor=#d6d6d6
| 195973 ||  || — || September 12, 2002 || Palomar || NEAT || — || align=right | 5.9 km || 
|-id=974 bgcolor=#d6d6d6
| 195974 ||  || — || September 12, 2002 || Palomar || NEAT || — || align=right | 6.7 km || 
|-id=975 bgcolor=#d6d6d6
| 195975 ||  || — || September 12, 2002 || Palomar || NEAT || — || align=right | 4.7 km || 
|-id=976 bgcolor=#d6d6d6
| 195976 ||  || — || September 14, 2002 || Palomar || NEAT || — || align=right | 3.7 km || 
|-id=977 bgcolor=#d6d6d6
| 195977 ||  || — || September 12, 2002 || Palomar || NEAT || THM || align=right | 4.7 km || 
|-id=978 bgcolor=#d6d6d6
| 195978 ||  || — || September 12, 2002 || Palomar || NEAT || HYG || align=right | 5.3 km || 
|-id=979 bgcolor=#d6d6d6
| 195979 ||  || — || September 12, 2002 || Palomar || NEAT || — || align=right | 4.3 km || 
|-id=980 bgcolor=#d6d6d6
| 195980 ||  || — || September 12, 2002 || Palomar || NEAT || — || align=right | 6.4 km || 
|-id=981 bgcolor=#d6d6d6
| 195981 ||  || — || September 12, 2002 || Haleakala || NEAT || THM || align=right | 3.3 km || 
|-id=982 bgcolor=#d6d6d6
| 195982 ||  || — || September 13, 2002 || Palomar || NEAT || — || align=right | 3.5 km || 
|-id=983 bgcolor=#d6d6d6
| 195983 ||  || — || September 13, 2002 || Socorro || LINEAR || — || align=right | 4.8 km || 
|-id=984 bgcolor=#d6d6d6
| 195984 ||  || — || September 14, 2002 || Palomar || NEAT || — || align=right | 4.6 km || 
|-id=985 bgcolor=#d6d6d6
| 195985 ||  || — || September 14, 2002 || Haleakala || NEAT || EUP || align=right | 6.0 km || 
|-id=986 bgcolor=#d6d6d6
| 195986 ||  || — || September 13, 2002 || Haleakala || NEAT || — || align=right | 5.6 km || 
|-id=987 bgcolor=#d6d6d6
| 195987 ||  || — || September 15, 2002 || Palomar || NEAT || — || align=right | 4.9 km || 
|-id=988 bgcolor=#d6d6d6
| 195988 ||  || — || September 15, 2002 || Palomar || NEAT || THM || align=right | 3.5 km || 
|-id=989 bgcolor=#d6d6d6
| 195989 ||  || — || September 15, 2002 || Palomar || NEAT || THM || align=right | 3.3 km || 
|-id=990 bgcolor=#d6d6d6
| 195990 ||  || — || September 15, 2002 || Palomar || NEAT || — || align=right | 4.4 km || 
|-id=991 bgcolor=#d6d6d6
| 195991 ||  || — || September 15, 2002 || Palomar || NEAT || EOS || align=right | 2.9 km || 
|-id=992 bgcolor=#d6d6d6
| 195992 ||  || — || September 13, 2002 || Anderson Mesa || LONEOS || EOS || align=right | 3.0 km || 
|-id=993 bgcolor=#d6d6d6
| 195993 ||  || — || September 13, 2002 || Haleakala || NEAT || — || align=right | 5.0 km || 
|-id=994 bgcolor=#d6d6d6
| 195994 ||  || — || September 14, 2002 || Haleakala || NEAT || — || align=right | 4.5 km || 
|-id=995 bgcolor=#d6d6d6
| 195995 ||  || — || September 14, 2002 || Haleakala || NEAT || — || align=right | 5.6 km || 
|-id=996 bgcolor=#d6d6d6
| 195996 ||  || — || September 14, 2002 || Palomar || R. Matson || THM || align=right | 3.0 km || 
|-id=997 bgcolor=#d6d6d6
| 195997 ||  || — || September 4, 2002 || Palomar || S. F. Hönig || — || align=right | 3.2 km || 
|-id=998 bgcolor=#d6d6d6
| 195998 Skipwilson ||  ||  || September 1, 2002 || Haleakala || R. Matson || — || align=right | 4.9 km || 
|-id=999 bgcolor=#d6d6d6
| 195999 ||  || — || September 12, 2002 || Palomar || R. Matson || — || align=right | 3.3 km || 
|-id=000 bgcolor=#d6d6d6
| 196000 Izzard ||  ||  || September 15, 2002 || Palomar || R. Matson || THM || align=right | 3.7 km || 
|}

References

External links 
 Discovery Circumstances: Numbered Minor Planets (195001)–(200000) (IAU Minor Planet Center)

0195